= Indicator (metadata) =

Boolean value in metadata that may contain only the values true or false

In metadata, an indicator is a Boolean value that may contain only the values true or false. The definition of an Indicator must include the meaning of a true value and should also include the meaning if the value is false.

If a data element may take another value to represent e.g. unknown or not applicable, then a Code should be used instead of an Indicator, and the meanings of all possible values should be clearly defined.

The suffix Indicator is used in ISO/IEC 11179 metadata registry standard as a representation term.

== Example of Use of Indicator in XML ==
An example use of the Indicator suffix is if an XML document was required to contain the passing status of a Student in a statewide assessment. The data element would be:

<StudentPassedAssessmentIndicator>true</StudentPassedAssessmentIndicator>

== Standards that use the indicator representation term ==
The following metadata registry standards use the term indicator

- ebXML
- NIEM
- GJXDM

== See also ==
- Metadata
- ISO/IEC 11179
- Representation term
- Code
