= Data steward =

Data professional role relating to data governance practice

A data steward is a data governance role within an organization, responsible for ensuring the quality and fitness for purpose of the organization's data assets, including the metadata for those data assets. A data steward may share some responsibilities with a data custodian, such as the awareness, accessibility, release, appropriate use, security and management of data. A data steward would also participate in the development and implementation of data assets. A data steward may seek to improve the quality and fitness for purpose of other data assets their organization depends upon but is not responsible for.

Data stewards have a specialist role that utilizes an organization's data governance processes, policies, guidelines and responsibilities for administering an organization's entire data in compliance with policy and/or regulatory obligations (e.g., GDPR, HIPAA). The overall objective of a data steward is the data quality of the data assets, datasets, data records and data elements. This includes documenting metainformation for the data, such as definitions, related rules/governance, physical manifestation, and related data models (most of these properties being specific to an attribute/concept relationship), identifying data owners/custodian's, clarifying their responsibilities, and supporting project requirements through data capture and documentation rules.

Data stewards begin the stewarding process with the identification of the data assets and elements which they will steward, with the ultimate result being standards, controls and data entry. The steward works closely with business glossary standards analysts (for standards), with data architect/modelers (for standards), with DQ analysts (for controls) and with operations team members (good-quality data going in per business rules) while entering data.

Data stewardship roles are common when organizations attempt to exchange data precisely and consistently between computer systems and to reuse data-related resources. Master data management often makes references to the need for data stewardship for its implementation to succeed. Data stewardship requires a clearly defined purpose and scope to be effective.

== Data steward responsibilities ==
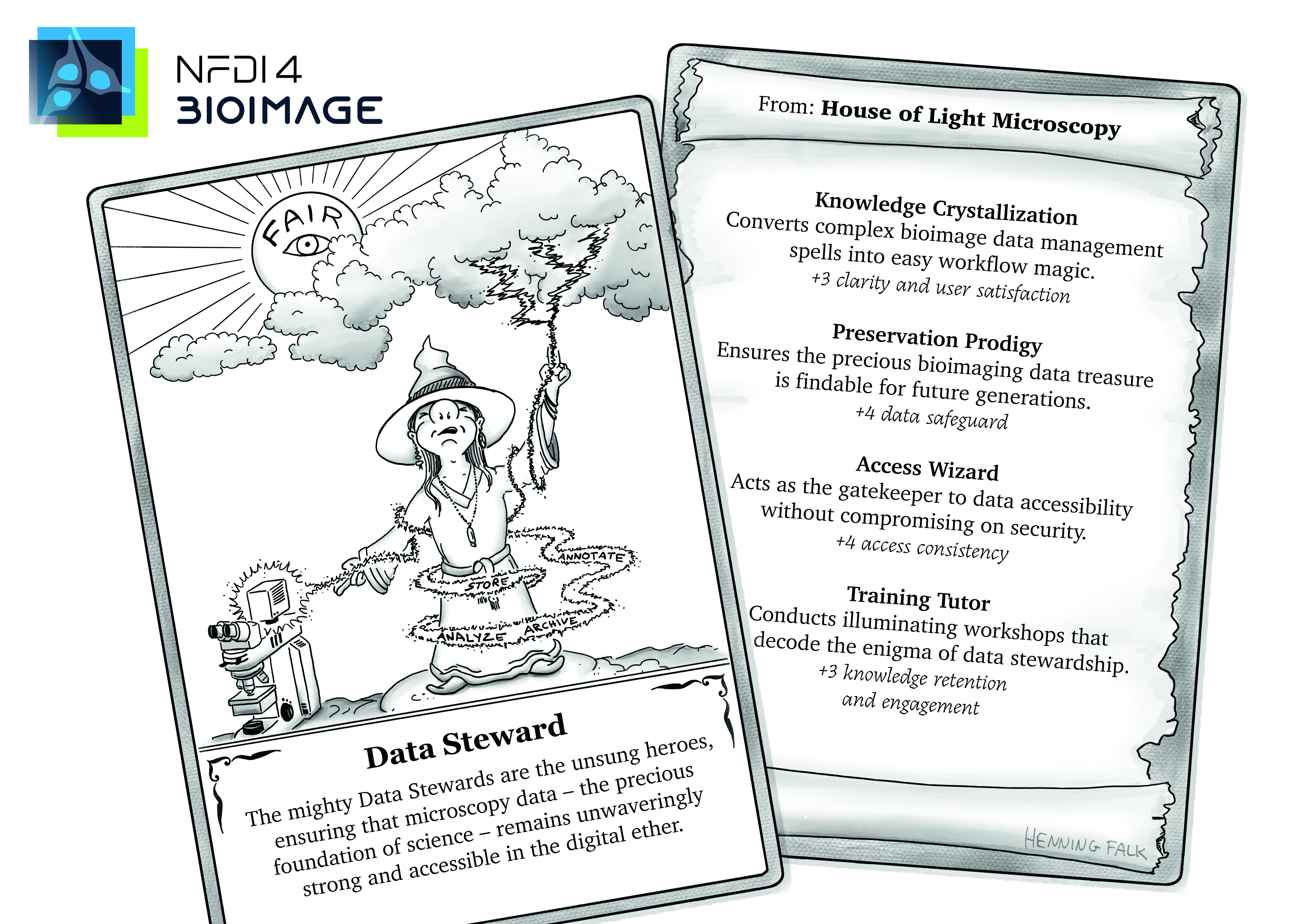
Data steward responsibilities in the context of bioimaging, styled as a trading card game.

A data steward ensures that each assigned data element:

1. Has clear and unambiguous data element definition
2. Does not conflict with other data elements in the metadata registry (removes duplicates, overlap etc.)
3. Has clear enumerated value definitions if it is of type Code
4. Is still being used (remove unused data elements)
5. Is being used consistently in various computer systems
6. Is being used, fit for purpose = Data Fitness
7. Has adequate documentation on appropriate usage and notes
8. Documents the origin and sources of authority on each metadata element
9. Is protected against unauthorised access or change

Responsibilities of data stewards vary between different organisations and institutions. For example, at Delft University of Technology, data stewards are perceived as the first contact point for any questions related to research data. They also have subject-specific background allowing them to easily connect with researchers and to contextualise data management problems to take into account disciplinary practices.

== Types of data stewards ==
Depending on the set of data stewardship responsibilities assigned to an individual, there are 4 types (or dimensions of responsibility) of data stewards typically found within an organization:

1. Data object data steward - responsible for managing reference data and attributes of one business data entity
2. Business data steward - responsible for managing critical data, both reference and transactional, created or used by one business function. The data steward may also serve as a liaison between the organization's data users and technical teams, helping to bridge the gap between business needs and technical requirements. They may also play a role in educating others within the organization about best practices for data management, and advocating for data-driven decision-making.
3. Process data steward - responsible for managing data across one business process
4. System data steward - responsible for managing data for at least one IT system

== Benefits of data stewardship ==
Systematic data stewardship can foster:

1. Faster analysis
2. Consistent use of data management resources
3. Easy mapping of data between computer systems and exchange documents
4. Lower costs associated with migration to (for example) service-oriented architecture (SOA)
5. Mitigation of data risk
6. Better control of dangers associated with privacy, legal, errors, etc.

Assignment of each data element to a person sometimes seems like an unimportant process. But multiple groups have found that users have greater trust and usage rates in systems where they can contact a person with questions on each data element.

== Examples ==
Delft University of Technology (TU Delft) offers an example of data stewardship implementation at a research institution. In 2017 the Data Stewardship Project was initiated at TU Delft to address research data management needs in a disciplinary manner across the whole campus. Dedicated data stewards with subject-specific background were appointed at every TU Delft faculty to support researchers with data management questions and to act as a linking point with the other institutional support services. The project is coordinated centrally by TU Delft Library, and it has its own website, blog and a YouTube channel.

The EPA metadata registry furnishes an example of data stewardship. Note that each data element therein has a "POC" (point of contact).

In 2023, ETH Zurich launched the Data Stewardship Network (DSN) to facilitate collaboration among employees engaged in data management, analysis, and code development across research groups. The DSN serves as a platform for networking and knowledge exchange, aiming to professionalize the role of data stewards who support research data management and reproducible workflows. Established by the team for Research Data Management and Digital Curation at the ETH Library, the DSN collaborates with Scientific IT Services to provide expertise in areas such as storage infrastructure and reproducible workflows.

== Data stewardship applications ==
Information stewardship applications are business solutions used by business users acting in the role of information steward (interpreting and enforcing information governance policy, for example). These developing solutions represent, for the most part, an amalgam of a number of disparate, previously IT-centric tools already on the market, but are organized and presented in such a way that information stewards (a business role) can support the work of information policy enforcement as part of their normal, business-centric, day-to-day work in a range of use cases.

The initial push for the formation of this new category of packaged software came from operational use cases — that is, use of business data in and between transactional and operational business applications. This is where most of the master data management efforts are undertaken in organizations. However, there is also a faster-growing interest in the new data lake arena for more analytical use cases.

== See also ==
- Data curation – Organization of collected data
- Data element – Semantic representation of data
- Data governance – Capability that enables an organization to ensure high data quality
- ISO/IEC 11179 – Standard for metadata registries
- Metadata – Data about other data
- Metadata registry – Central location to store metadata
- Representation term – Semantic representation of data type
