= Representation term =

Semantic representation of data type

A representation term is a word, or a combination of words, that semantically represent the data type (value domain) of a data element. A representation term is commonly referred to as a class word by those familiar with data dictionaries. ISO/IEC 11179-5:2005 defines representation term as a designation of an instance of a representation class As used in ISO/IEC 11179, the representation term is that part of a data element name that provides a semantic pointer to the underlying data type. A Representation class is a class of representations. This representation class provides a way to classify or group data elements.

A Representation Term may be thought of as an attribute of a data element in a metadata registry that classifies the data element according to the type of data stored in the data element.

Representation terms are typically "approved" by the organization or standards body using them. For example, the UN publishes its approved list as part of the UN/CEFACT Core Components Technical Specification. The Universal Data Element Framework uses a subset of CCTS representation terms and assigns numeric codes to those used.

== Use cases for representation term ==
=== Managing value domains ===
A value domain expresses the set of allowed values for a data element. The representation term (and typically the corresponding data type term) comprise a taxonomy for the value domains within a data set. This taxonomy is the representation class. Thus the representation term can be used to control proliferation of value domains by ensuring equivalent value domains use the same representation term.

=== Finding equivalent properties ===
When a person or software agent is analyzing two separate metadata registries to find property equivalence, the Representation Term can be used as a guide. For example, if system A has a Data Element such as PersonGenderCode and system B has a data element such as PersonSexCode the code suffix might assist the two systems to only match data elements that have the suffix "Code". However, a taxonomy of property terms (i.e. "Sex" or "Gender") is much more efficient in this respect.

=== Inference ===
The Representation Term can be used in many ways to do inferences on data sets. Representation Terms tells the observer of any data stream about the data types and gives an indication of how the Data Element can be used. This is critical when mapping metadata registries to external Data Elements. For example, if you are sent a record about a person you may look for any "ID" suffix to understand how the remote system may differentiate two distinct records.

=== Required fields ===
Representation Terms are also used to make inferences about the requirements of a property. For example, if a data stream had Data Element PersonBirthDateAndTime you would know that BOTH the date AND time are available and relevant, not just the date. If the birth time was optional, a separate data elements should be used such as PersonBirthDate and PersonBirthTime.

=== Finding data warehouse dimensions and measures ===
When creating a data warehouse, a business analyst looks at the Representation Terms to quickly find the dimensions and measures of a subject matter in order to build OLAP cubes. For example:

1. Indicator or Code are used to create data warehouse dimensions
2. Date or DateTime are used to relate to the time dimension, which are frequently shared between cubes using conformed dimensions
3. Amount, Number, Measure or Value terms (which can be added together) are candidates for a measurement
4. Name and Text are used for screen labels or other descriptive elements
5. Percent needs to be analyzed since they can't really be added together with clear meaning
6. ID is used to remove duplicate records

=== Core Components Technical Specification ===
The joint ISO/UN Core Components Technical Specification formally define both the allowed set of representation terms and the corresponding set of data types. ISO 15000-5 is an implementation layer of ISO 11179 and normatively expresses a set of rules to semantically define conceptual and physical/logical data models for a wide variety of uses. In ISO 15000-5, the representation term provides a mechanism to harmonize the value domains of candidate data elements before being added to the overall data model(s). ISO 15000-5 is being used by a number of government, standards development organizations, and private sector as the basis for data modeling.

=== Universal Data Element Framework ===
Some informal standards such as the Universal Data Element Framework (which refer to a Representation Term as a "Property Word") assign unique integer IDs to each Representation Term. This allows metadata mapping tools to map one set of data elements into other metadata vocabularies. An example of these mappings can be found at Property word ID. Note that as of November 2005 the UDEF concepts have not been widely adopted.

== Example of representation terms as an XML suffix ==
For example, if an XML Data fragment had the following:

<Person>
 <PersonID>123-45-6789</PersonID>
 <PersonGivenName>John</PersonGivenName>
 <PersonFamilyName>Smith</PersonFamilyName>
 <PersonBirthDate>1990-08-14</PersonBirthDate>
</Person>

In the example above, the Representation terms are "ID" for the <PersonID>, the suffix "Name" for the Given and Family names, and "Date" for the <PersonBirthDate>.

== Sample representation terms ==
The following are samples of Representation Terms that have been used for the exchange of electronic messages in systems such as NIEM or GJXDM 3.0: [note: the restrictions expressed here are limited to those specifications and do not represent universal consensus]

Sample Representation Terms
Term	Usage
Amount	Monetary value with units of currency.
BinaryObject	Set of finite-length sequences of binary octets used to represent sound, images and other structures.
Code	An enumerated list of all allowable values. Each enumerated value is a string that for brevity represents a specific meaning. For example, for a PersonGenderCode the valid values might be "male", "female" or "unknown".
Date	An ISO 8601 date usually in the format YYYY-MM-DD
DateTime	An ISO 8601 date (in the format YYYY-MM-DD) AND time structure. Note: Do not use unless BOTH the date AND time are REQUIRED fields. If one OR the other is optional always specify the data elements as separate date and time elements.
Graphic	Used to store images. Secondary to Binary Object.
ID	Abbreviation for Identifier
Identifier	A language-independent label, sign or token used to establish identity of, and uniquely distinguish one instance of an object within an identification scheme.
Indicator	Boolean, exactly two mutually exclusive values (true or false). A precise definition must be given for the meaning of a true value.
Measure	Numeric value determined by measurement with units. Typically used with items such as height or weight. if the unit of measure is not clear it should be specified.
Name	A textual label used as identification of an object. A name is usually meaningful in some language, and is the primary means of identification of objects for humans. Unlike an identifier, a name is not necessarily unique.
Number	Assigned or determined by calculation.
Text	Character string generally in the form of words.
Time	An ISO 8601 time structure.
Value	A type of Numeric.
Percent	A type of Numeric that traditionally is the results of a ratio calculation that ranges from values of 0 to 1 for values of 0% to 100%.
Quantity	Non-monetary numeric value or count with units.
Rate	A type of Numeric
Year	An ISO 8601 Year

== Pros of representation terms ==
- Use of representation terms in a data element name is a convention that is widely adopted by several large systems such as NIEM, GJXDM and ebXML.
- Many data architects that are responsible for mapping XML from foreign sources find Representation terms very useful.
- Standards such as the UDEF depend on accurate coding of Representation Terms.
- Tools that validate against enumeration lists can distinguish coded values quickly by looking for the "Code" suffix.
- Dimensional analysis of data can use representation terms for creating data warehouses. Representation terms such as Code and Indicator can be converted into dimensions and Amounts and Measures can be converted to measures in a fact table.

== Cons of representation terms ==
- No universal agreement exists as to the definitive set of representation terms.
- There is not always a direct relationship between a representation term and the value domain it represents. This is caused by further qualifying the corresponding data type term.

== Standards that use representation terms ==
- Electronic Business using eXtensible Markup Language
- The US Government's National Information Exchange Model requires the use of representation terms for XML data elements.
- The US Department of Justice data exchange standards Global Justice XML Data Model required the use of representation terms for XML data elements.

[Note] This is an extremely limited set of the wide range of standards that specify the use of representation terms.

== See also ==
- ISO/IEC 11179
- ISO/IEC 11404
- Metadata
- Data element
- Representation class
- Universal Data Element Framework
- XML
- XML schema

== Notes ==
1. ISO/IEC 11179-5 3.11 (238K zip file)
2. In ISO/IEC 11179-3:2003 5.4 (546K zip file) it is actually representation class which is specified as an attribute of a data element.
