= Time (metadata) =

Under some metadata standards, time is a representation term used to specify a time of day in the ISO 8601 time format.

Note that Time should not be confused with the DateAndTime representation term which requires that both the date and time to be supplied.

== Metadata registries that use the time representation term ==
- NIEM
- ebXML
- GJXDM

== See also ==
- metadata
- ISO/IEC 11179
- Representation term
- ISO 8601
