= Date (metadata) =

Metadata representation term

In metadata, the term date is a representation term used to specify a calendar date in the Gregorian calendar. Many data representation standards such as XML, XML Schema, Web Ontology Language specify that ISO date format ISO 8601 should be used.

Note that Date should not be confused with the DateAndTime representation term which requires that both the date and time to be supplied.

== Metadata registries that use the date representation term ==
- NIEM
- ebXML
- GJXDM

== See also ==
- metadata
- ISO/IEC 11179
- Representation term
- ISO 8601
