= XMDR =

The Extended Metadata Registry (XMDR) is a project proposing and testing a set of extensions to the ISO/IEC 11179 metadata registry specifications that deal with the development of improved standards and technology for storing and retrieving the semantics of data elements, terminologies, and concept structures in metadata registries.

== See also ==
- metadata
- Metadata registry
- ISO/IEC 11179
- XML
