= Identification scheme =

In information management, a system to identify items

In metadata, an identification scheme is used to identify unique records in a set. If a data element is used to identify a record within a data set, the data element uses the Identifier representation term. An identification scheme should be contrasted with a classification scheme. Classification schemes are used to classify individual records into categories. Many records in a data set may be in a single category.

== See also ==
- Classification scheme
- Metadata
- Representation term
