= Representation class =

A representation term is a word, or a combination of words, used as part of a data element name. Representation class is sometimes used as a synonym for representation term.

In ISO/IEC 11179, a representation class provides a way to classify or group data elements. A representation class is effectively a specialized classification scheme. Hence, there is currently some discussion in ISO over the merits of keeping representation class as a separate entity in 11179, versus collapsing it into the general classification scheme facility. A clear distinction between the two mechanisms, however, is that 11179 allows a data element to be classified by only one representation class, whereas there is no such restriction on other classification schemes.

ISO/IEC 11179 does not specify that representation terms should be drawn from the values of representation class, though it would make sense to do so, nor does it provide any mechanism to ensure any sort of consistency (whatever that might mean) between the representation terms used to name a data element, and the representation class used to classify it.

The term representation class has been used in metadata registry standards for many years. Today it has a combination of meanings and now goes well beyond how a data element is represented in a computer system. In practice this term is used to shed light on the semantics or meaning of the data element.

== Definitions of "representation class" ==
There are several alternate definitions for representation class. Some of these are taken from the ISO documents. Note that these documents are copyrighted and extracts can only be taken under the fair use rules.

=== ISO Definitions of representation class ===
==== From ISO/IEC TR 20943-1 First edition 2003-08-01 pdf page 91 ====
B.2.3 Representation class

Representation class is the value domain for representation. The set of classes make it easy to distinguish among the elements in the registry. For instance, a data element categorized with the representation class amount is different from an element categorized as number. It probably will not make sense to compare the contents of these elements, or perform calculations using them together.

Representation class is a mechanism by which the functional and/or presentational category of an item may be conveyed to the user.

==== From ISO/IEC 11179-3 Second edition 2003-02-15 ====
3.3.51 data element representation class the class of representation of a data element

== See also ==
- Metadata registry

== Notes ==
1. Link to the ISO bugzilla discussion of Representation class
