= Database catalog =

Metadata of database objects

A database catalog of a database instance consists of metadata in which definitions of database objects such as base tables, views (virtual tables), synonyms, value ranges, indexes, users, and user groups are stored. It is an architecture product that documents the database's content and data quality.

== Standards ==
The SQL standard specifies a uniform means to access the catalog, called the INFORMATION_SCHEMA, but not all databases follow this, even if they implement other aspects of the SQL standard. For an example of database-specific metadata access methods, see Oracle metadata.

== See also ==
- Data dictionary
- Data lineage
- Data Catalog Vocabulary, a W3C standard for metadata
- Metadata registry, central location where metadata definitions are stored and maintained
- Metadata repository, a database created to store metadata
