= METeOR =

Australia's repository for national metadata standards

METeOR (Metadata Online Registry), Australia’s repository for national metadata standards for health, housing and community services statistics and information. METeOR is a Metadata registry based on the 2003 version of the ISO/IEC 11179 Information technology - Metadata registries standard. The development of METeOR was commissioned by the Australian Institute of Health and Welfare to store, manage and disseminate metadata in the Australian health, community services and housing assistance sectors. Development of METeOR was performed by Aggmedia and Synop, and based on the open-source Sytadel CMS.

In August 2018, the AIHW entered an agreement with the CSIRO for the supply of a new platform for the METeOR registry, this was due to be delivered in 2020. As of August 2020, the AIHW has committed to replacing METeOR with an internally developed solution.

On 29 April 2022, the new METEOR platform was launched. By launch, over AUD$1.7 million was spent between July 2019 and June 2022 on the update of the Meteor platform, with $771,000 spent during 2021 on internal software development, and a further $267,000 spent on additional work in-progress in previous years.

== Awards ==
In 2011, the AIHW won a FutureGov 2011 international award for innovation and modernisation.

== See also ==
- Aristotle Metadata Registry (a commercial ISO/IEC 11179 metadata registry)
- Metadata
- Metadata registry
- ISO/IEC 11179
- Content management system
- Web content management system
- XML
