= Simple Modular Architecture Research Tool =

Biological database

SMART
Content
- Description: Identification scheme for protein domains.
- Data types captured: Protein domains
- Organisms: all

Contact
- Research center: European Molecular Biology Laboratory
- Primary citation: PMID 18978020

Access
- Website: http://smart.embl-heidelberg.de

Miscellaneous
- License: Free to academics, but not commercial users
- Version: 7
- Curation policy: Yes

Simple Modular Architecture Research Tool (SMART) is a biological database that is used in the identification and analysis of protein domains within protein sequences. SMART uses profile-hidden Markov models built from multiple sequence alignments to detect protein domains in protein sequences. The most recent release of SMART contains 1,204 domain models. Data from SMART was used in creating the Conserved Domain Database collection and is also distributed as part of the InterPro database. The database is hosted by the European Molecular Biology Laboratory in Heidelberg.
