= Identifier =

Name that identifies a specific entity

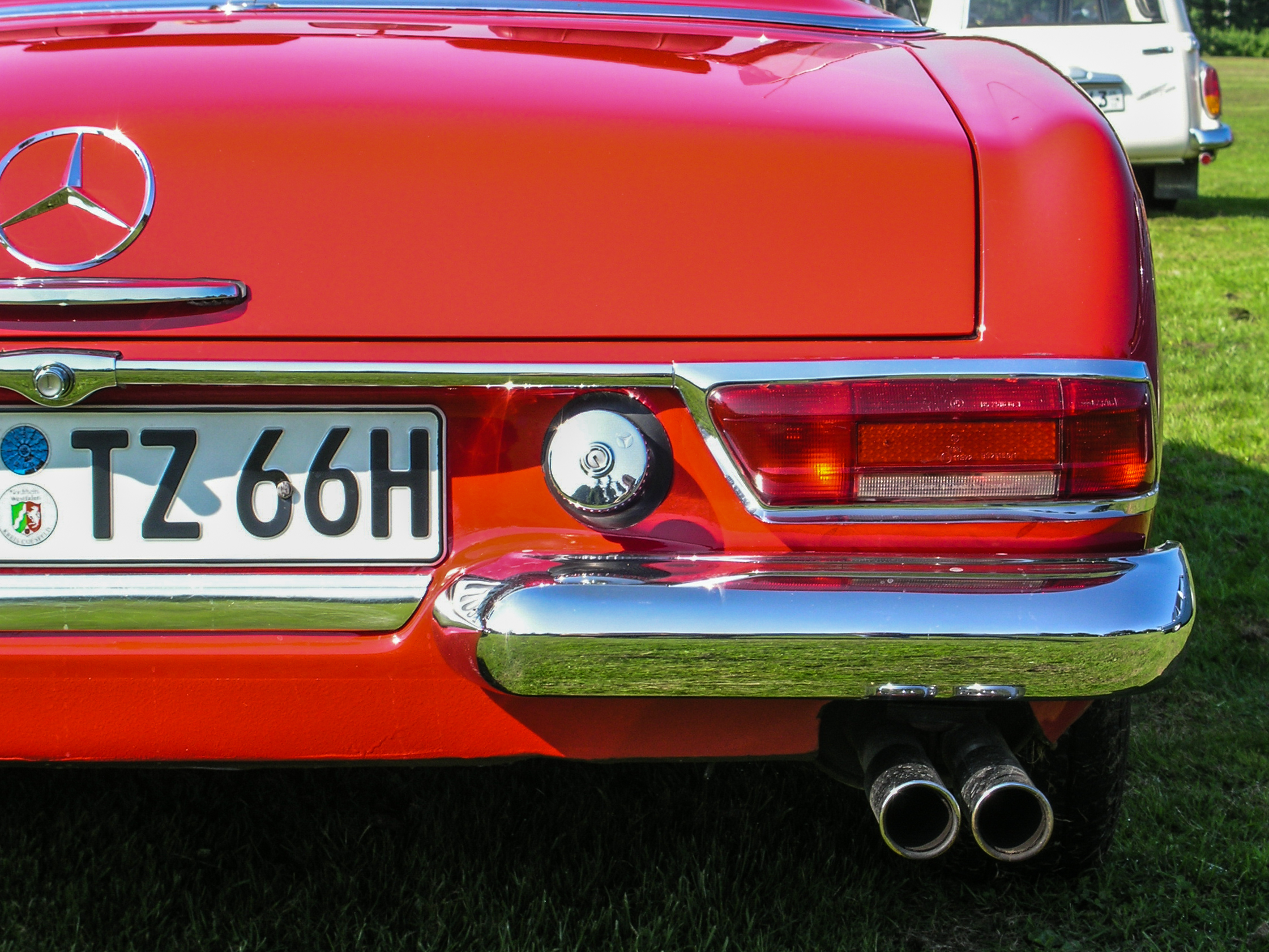
Registration plates are used to display identifiers for motor vehicles.

An identifier is a name that identifies (that is, labels the identity of) either a unique class of objects or a unique instance of such objects; the class or instance may be an idea, person, physical countable object (or class thereof), or physical noncountable substance (or class thereof). The abbreviation "ID" may refer to identity, identification (the process of identifying), or an identifier (that is, an instance of identification).

An identifier may be a word, number, letter, symbol, or any combination of those. If the identifier follows an encoding system—wherein parts of the identifier stand for [represent] ideas or longer names—it is often referred to as a code or ID code. (Note: For instance the ISO/IEC 11179 metadata registry standard defines a code as "system of valid symbols that substitute for longer values" in contrast to identifiers without symbolic meaning.) Identifiers that do not follow any encoding scheme are often said to be arbitrary IDs as they have no greater meaning. (Note: Sometimes identifiers are called "codes" even when they are actually arbitrary, whether because the speaker believes that they have deeper meaning or simply because they are speaking casually and imprecisely.)

A unique identifier (UID) is an identifier that refers to only one instance—only one particular object in the universe. A part number is an identifier, but it is not a unique identifier—for that, a serial number would be needed, to identify each instance of the part design. For example, the identifier "Model T" identifies the class (or model) of automobiles that Ford's Model T comprises; whereas the unique identifier "Model T Serial Number 159,862" identifies one specific member of that class—that is, one particular Model T car, owned by one specific person.

== Metadata ==
In metadata, an identifier is a language-independent label, sign or token that uniquely identifies an object within an identification scheme. The suffix "identifier" is also used as a representation term when naming a data element.

ID codes may inherently carry metadata along with them. For example, if a food package has the identifier 2011-09-25T15:42Z-MFR5-P02-243-45, you not only have that data, you also have (if you are aware of how that data encodes its information) the metadata that tells you that it was packaged on September 25, 2011, at 3:42pm UTC, manufactured by Licensed Vendor Number 5, at the Peoria, IL, USA plant, in Building 2, and was the 243rd package off the line in that shift, and was inspected by Inspector Number 45.

Arbitrary identifiers might lack metadata. For example, if a food package just says 100054678214, its ID may not tell anything except identity—no date, manufacturer name, production sequence rank, or inspector number. In some cases, arbitrary identifiers such as sequential serial numbers leak information (i.e. the German tank problem). Opaque identifiers—identifiers designed to avoid leaking even that small amount of information—include "really opaque pointers" and Version 4 UUIDs.

== In computer science ==
In computer science, identifiers (IDs) are lexical tokens that name entities. Identifiers are used extensively in virtually all information processing systems. Identifying entities makes it possible to refer to them, which is essential for any kind of symbolic processing.

=== In computer languages ===
In computer languages, identifiers are tokens (also called symbols) which name language entities. Some of the kinds of entities an identifier might denote include variables, types, labels, subroutines, and packages.

== Ambiguity ==
=== Identifiers (IDs) versus Unique identifiers (UIDs) ===
A resource may carry multiple identifiers. Typical examples are:

- One person with multiple names, nicknames, and forms of address (titles, salutations)
  - For example: One specific person may be identified by all of the following identifiers: Jane Smith; Jane Elizabeth Meredith Smith; Jane E. M. Smith; Jane E. Smith; Janie Smith; Janie; Little Janie (as opposed to her mother or sister or cousin, Big Janie); Aunt Jane; Auntie Janie; Mom; Grandmom; Nana; Kelly's mother; Billy's grandmother; Ms. Smith; Dr. Smith; Jane E. Smith, PhD; and Fuzzy (her jocular nickname at work).
- One document with multiple versions
- One substance with multiple names (for example, CAS index names versus IUPAC names; INN generic drug names versus USAN generic drug names versus brand names)

The inverse is also possible, where multiple resources are represented with the same identifier (discussed below).

=== Implicit context and namespace conflicts ===
Many codes and nomenclatural systems originate within a small namespace. Over the years, some of them bleed into larger namespaces (as people interact in ways they formerly had not, e.g., cross-border trade, scientific collaboration, military alliance, and general cultural interconnection or assimilation). When such dissemination happens, the limitations of the original naming convention, which had formerly been latent and moot, become painfully apparent, often necessitating retronymy, synonymity, translation/transcoding, and so on. Such limitations generally accompany the shift away from the original context to the broader one. Typically the system shows implicit context (context was formerly assumed, and narrow), lack of capacity (e.g., low number of possible IDs, reflecting the outmoded narrow context), lack of extensibility (no features defined and reserved against future needs), and lack of specificity and disambiguating capability (related to the context shift, where longstanding uniqueness encounters novel nonuniqueness). Within computer science, this problem is called naming collision. The story of the origination and expansion of the CODEN system provides a good case example in a recent-decades, technical-nomenclature context. The capitalization variations seen with specific designators reveals an instance of this problem occurring in natural languages, where the proper noun/common noun distinction (and its complications) must be dealt with. A universe in which every object had a UID would not need any namespaces, which is to say that it would constitute one gigantic namespace; but human minds could never keep track of, or semantically interrelate, so many UIDs.

=== Name vs. identifier ===
The concepts of name and identifier are denotatively equal, and the terms are thus denotatively synonymous; but they are not always connotatively synonymous, because code names and ID numbers are often connotatively distinguished from names in the sense of traditional natural language naming. For example, both "Jamie Zawinski" and "Netscape employee number 20" are identifiers for the same specific human being; but normal English-language connotation may consider "Jamie Zawinski" a "name" and not an "identifier", whereas it considers "Netscape employee number 20" an "identifier" but not a "name." This is an emic indistinction rather than an etic one.

== Identifiers in various disciplines ==
Identifier	Scope
atomic number, corresponding one-to-one with element name	international (via ISV)
Australian Business Number	Australian
CAGE code	U.S. and NATO
CAS registry number	originated in U.S.; today international (via ISV)
CODEN	originated in U.S.; today international
Digital object identifier (DOI, doi)	Handle System Namespace, international scope
DIN standard number	originated in Germany; today international
E number	originated in E.U.; may be seen internationally
EC number	
Employer Identification Number (EIN)	U.S.
Electronic Identifier Serial Publicaction (EISP)	international
Global Trade Item Number	international
Group identifier	many scopes, e.g., specific computer systems
International Chemical Identifier	international
International Standard Book Number (ISBN)	ISBN is part of the EAN Namespace; international scope
International eBook Identifier Number (IEIN)	international
International Standard Serial Number (ISSN)	international
ISO standard number, e.g., ISO 8601	international
Library of Congress Control Number	U.S., with some international bibliographic usefulness
Personal identification number (Denmark)	Denmark
Pharmaceutical code	Many different systems
Product batch number	
Serial Item and Contribution Identifier	U.S., with some international bibliographic usefulness
Serial number	many scopes, e.g., company-specific, government-specific
Service batch number	
Social Security Number	U.S.
Tax file number	Australian
Unique Article Identifier (UAI)	international

== See also ==
- Barcode
- Binomial nomenclature
- British Approved Name
- Data descriptor
- Data element
- Descriptor
- Diagnosis code
- Document management system
- File descriptor
- Food labeling regulations
- Gene nomenclature
- Handle (computing)
- Identification
- Identity (object-oriented programming)
- Identity document
- Index term
- Metadata
- Name binding
- Namespace
- Naming convention (programming)
- National identification number
- Nomenclature – contains various standardized naming systems
- Nomenclature code
  - Chemical nomenclature
  - International Code of Nomenclature for algae, fungi, and plants
  - International Code of Nomenclature of Bacteria
  - International Code of Nomenclature for Cultivated Plants
  - International Code of Zoological Nomenclature
- Overloading
- Part number
- Persistent identifier
- Personally identifiable information
- Product code
- Reference (computer science)
- Referent
- Representation term
- Systematized Nomenclature of Medicine
- Uniform resource identifier (URI)
- Unique identifier
- Unique key
