= Portal of Medical Data Models =

Medical research infrastructure

The portal for medical data models is a German and European medical research infrastructure. It is an open-access metadata-repository initiated for scientific purposes that can generate, analyse, release and reuse medical forms.

== Background ==
Each day large amounts of data are gathered by electronic health records. Because health care information systems are not compatible among themselves in general, structured data cannot easily be exchanged in between different institutions. Only a small part of all medical forms are openly available. Through this shortness of transparency, data-models adjustment processes in health care are being vastly interfered. Know-how of current or terminated studies and clinical documentation cannot be reused.

== Goals and target audience ==
Primary goals for medical data models are releasing reliable medical forms and data models, establishing transparent and interoperable standards for medical research and raising efficiency in the design of case report files. Besides improving the quality of documentation forms by reusing reliable forms and data-models (Secondary Use, Best Practise), the comparability of research outcomes shall be enhanced. The portal is mainly established for medical professionals, for example:

- Medical doctors
- Medical Information Scientist
- Data manager
- Medical information specialist

== Features ==
Currently, the portal contains more than 20.000 forms with more than 350.000 active data elements, making it Europe's largest open-access portal for medical forms (March 2019). Available forms are: clinical research forms (Case Report Forms, Register-Items), routine documentation (e. g. EHR-forms) and quality assurance (e.g. data from the AQUA-Institute). Coded via UMLS-Metathesaurus, much content is available for semantic analyses. The content of the forms are provided in the standard data type for medical research (CDISC ODM) and, besides the original format, available in various data types, for example REDCap, MACRO, CDA, CSV, ADL as well as in Fast Healthcare Interoperability Resources (FHIR) Questionnaire Format. As concluded by the FDA, the CDISC ODM-XML-Format for documentation in pharmaceutical research will be mandatory within the next two years, the portal already meets state of the art demands.

== Sustainability ==
In collaboration with the university and regional library in Münster, all gathered files are archived and allocated to every German library, securing a sustainable use of this meta-data-repository. The medical-data-portal is known as German (RIsources) and European research infrastructure (MERIL) and is developed by the Institute of Medical Informatics, University of Münster, Germany.

== Funding ==
The project is funded by the German Research Foundation (DFG, grant no. DU 352/11-1)
