= Descriptor =

Descriptor may refer to:

- An identifier

== Information technology ==
- Short Payment Descriptor, a compact data format for an easy exchange of a payment information using modern electronic channels
- Data descriptor, a software or hardware structure describing data
- Visual descriptors, a representation of visual features in image or video
- Security descriptor, a Windows data structure containing security information
- Segment descriptor, used for memory addressing in x86 computer architectures
- Index term, also known as a "descriptor" in information retrieval
- File descriptor, an abstract key for accessing a file

== Chemistry ==
- Molecular descriptor, which helps characterize a chemical compound
- Descriptor (chemistry), a prefix used to specify a chemical name

== Other ==
- Billing descriptor, the merchant's name that appears on a credit card statement

== See also ==
- Epithet, a descriptive term (word or phrase), accompanying or occurring in place of a name and having entered common usage
