= Universal Data Element Framework =

(UDEF) A framework for categorizing, naming, and indexing data, see new framework: ODEF

The Universal Data Element Framework (UDEF) was a controlled vocabulary developed by The Open Group. It provided a framework for categorizing, naming, and indexing data. It assigned to every item of data a structured alphanumeric tag plus a controlled vocabulary name that describes the meaning of the data. This allowed relating data elements to similar elements defined by other organizations.

UDEF defined a Dewey-decimal like code for each concept. For example, an "employee number" is often used in human resource management. It has a UDEF tag a.5_12.35.8 and a controlled vocabulary description "Employee.PERSON_Employer.Assigned.IDENTIFIER".

UDEF has been superseded by the Open Data Element Framework (ODEF).

== Examples ==
In an application used by a hospital, the last name and first name of several people could include the following example concepts:

- Patient Person Family Name – find the word “Patient” under the UDEF object “Person” and find the word “Family” under the UDEF property “Name”
- Patient Person Given Name – find the word “Patient” under the UDEF object “Person” and find the word “Given” under the UDEF property “Name”
- Doctor Person Family Name – find the word “Doctor” under the UDEF object “Person” and find the word “Family” under the UDEF property “Name”
- Doctor Person Given Name – find the word “Doctor” under the UDEF object “Person” and find the word “Given” under the UDEF property “Name”

For the examples above, the following UDEF IDs are available:

- “Patient Person Family Name” the UDEF ID is “au.5_11.10”
- “Patient Person Given Name” the UDEF ID is “au.5_12.10”
- “Doctor Person Family Name” the UDEF ID is “aq.5_11.10”
- “Doctor Person Given Name” the UDEF ID is “aq.5_12.10”

== See also ==
- Data integration
- ISO/IEC 11179
- National Information Exchange Model
- Metadata
- Semantic web
- Data element
- Representation term
- Controlled vocabulary
