= Global Justice XML Data Model =

The Global Justice XML Data Model (GJXDM or Global JXDM) is a data reference model for the exchange of information within the justice and public safety communities. The Global JXDM is a product of the Global Justice Information Sharing Initiative's (Global) Infrastructure and Standards Working Group (ISWG), and was developed by the Global ISWG's XML Structure Task Force (XSTF).

The Global JXDM is a comprehensive product that includes a data model, a data dictionary, and an XML schema that together is known as the Global JXDM. Global JXDM is independent of vendors, operating systems, storage media, and applications and is quickly becoming key technology for assisting how criminal and judicial organizations exchange information. The Global JXDM is sponsored by the United States Department of Justice (DOJ), Office of Justice Programs (OJP), with development supported by the Global XML Structure Task Force (GXSTF), which works closely with researchers at the Georgia Tech Research Institute (GTRI). New releases are issued by the GXSTF, which reviews and evaluates each version of the Global JXDM. The GXSTF solicits feedback from technical experts and practitioners in both industry and government and authorizes Global JXDM changes based on this feedback. All approved additions, deletions, and modifications are applied to future releases, with a cumulative change log published along with each release. When a reasonable number of updates are approved by the GXSTF, a new version is released.

The Global JXDM is an XML standard designed specifically for criminal justice information exchanges, providing law enforcement, public safety agencies, prosecutors, public defenders, and the judicial branch with a tool to effectively share data and information in a timely manner. The Global JXDM removes the burden from agencies to independently create exchange standards, and because of its extensibility, there is more flexibility to deal with unique agency requirements and changes. Through the use of a common vocabulary that is understood system-to-system, the Global JXDM enables access from multiple sources and reuse in multiple applications.

== History ==
The federal government has long encouraged criminal justice agencies throughout the country to share information electronically. Historically, however, justice agencies have developed or invested in information systems independently of one another. While the applications that different organizations utilize to manage cases and store important information typically perform very similar functions, they often utilize unique technology or formatting that makes them incompatible with other systems. Consequently, many justice agencies have been forced to resort to inefficient methods of delivering information to each other, such as delivering important filings and documents via the postal service.

In March 2001, the OJP and the DOJ sponsored an effort to create a framework for the secure and timely sharing of information across the justice domain. Their objective was to lay the foundation for local, state, tribal, and national interoperability by providing a “common ground” that information systems across the country could use for data exchanges. After a two-year effort, the first prerelease of GJXDM was released in April 2003.

== Data Dictionary ==
When criminal justice agencies share data, they transmit Information Exchange Packages (IEPs) to each other. An IEP is a set of data that is transmitted between agencies for a specific purpose. For example, if a police department wanted the local prosecutor to charge an individual for a crime, the IEP sent from the police department would contain a very specific set of data (victim name, date and time of the offense, etc.) as well as any associated artifacts (dashcam video, 911 audio transcript).

Complications arise, however, from the fact that the justice community does not utilize a standard, common vocabulary when describing and recording events. Differences in terminologies can make it difficult or impossible for shared data to be interpreted and utilized. For example, if the police department in the above scenario utilizes the term "Supervision Official" to describe the officer in charge of an arrest, while the prosecutor typically uses it to describe an officer supervising a suspect, the transmitted IEP will result in confusion.

The Global Justice XML Data Dictionary (Global JXDD or GJXDD) provides a solution to this problem by defining the common vocabulary utilized in the GJXDM. The GJXDD breaks down the information that is exchanged between agencies into individual data components and gives them unique names and definitions. These data components in turn serve as the “building blocks” of data exchanges.

Because the GJXDD defines a massive number of data components, smaller data dictionaries must be created for individual IEPs. These data dictionaries only contain the concepts and definitions relevant to their corresponding data transfers.

== Data Model ==
While data dictionaries define the vocabulary utilized by the GJXDM to transmit IEPs, the relationships between the different data components need to be defined in order for the data to be interpreted correctly. For example, the personal information for a number of people may be included in a data exchange regarding a burglary. If the relationships between these data components are not defined, it will be impossible for justice professionals to distinguish the personal information of the owner of the house from that of the person who burglarized it.

The GJXDM utilizes data models to describe the relationships between the different "building blocks" included in an IEP. Data models link these different concepts together by the use of two types of relationships: “is_a” and “has_a.” The “is_a” type is used when one object or concept inherits characteristics from another type. The “has_a” relationship shows what kind of information an object has. In the example above, the burglar “is_a” person, while an investigating officer “has_a” Employment Person ID.

== Reuse Repository ==
The true power of the GJXDM lies in its reuse repository, known as the IEPD Clearinghouse. Whenever a data dictionary and data model are created for an IEP, they are packaged within Information Exchange Package Documentation (IEPD). These IEPDs can be utilized as standards or templates for the creation of IEPs. For example, if an agency created an IEPD for an arrest filing, they could submit the IEPD to the Clearinghouse, where it could be downloaded by any agency wishing to facilitate electronic arrest filings. This saves agencies a great deal of time and resources as they don't have to create an arrest filing data dictionary and data model from scratch.

== Version 3.0.3 ==
In September, 2005, the Office of Justice Programs (OJP), together with the Global Justice Information Sharing Initiative (Global), officially issued a newer version of the Global Justice Extensible Markup Language (XML) Data Model (Global JXDM) to the justice community, Version 3.0.3. This "maintenance" release of the Version 3.0 Global JXDM series is enhanced to increase the ability of justice and public safety communities to share justice information at all levels laying the foundation for local, state, and national justice interoperability.

Some of the enhancements incorporated into Version 3.0.3 include the addition of new components that are compatible with previous version 3.0.2, new "sequenceID" values for "PersonNameType" sub-elements to assign an alternate ordering independent of the physical XML sequence, and an updated Frequently Asked Questions (FAQs) resource that incorporates content from the Global JXDM Version 3.0 Reference Notes along with added FAQs.

An important feature is that the Global JXDM, Version 3.0.3, is forward compatible with all XML instances written for Global JXDM, Version 3.0. Global JXDM, Version 3.0, instances validate with all 3.0.3 schemas and schema subsets. Global JXDM, Versions 3.0.2 and 3.0, will remain available indefinitely. For a list of specific updates, refer to the Global JXDM Change Log.

Since its first prerelease in April 2003, the Global JXDM has continued to undergo intensive reviews, receive feedback and error reports online from the public, and provide a Global JXDM Listserv discussion forum for sharing expertise and support. Today, more than 50 law enforcement and justice-related projects have been implemented utilizing the Global JXDM, further demonstrating the flexibility and stability of the Global JXDM.

The Global JXDM, Version 3.0.3 Global Justice XML Data Dictionary (Global JXDD) types and properties are rendered as XML Schema types, elements, and attributes. Also included are the most current enumeration type schemas (code tables) and their proxy schemas. Version 3.0.3 is compatible with Versions 3.0.2 and 3.0. See the FAQ on compatibility for an explanation.

== Previous releases ==
- 3.0 The first operational release of the Global JXDM.
- 3.0.1 Version 3.0.1 of the GJXDM has been retracted. See FAQ.
- 3.0.2 Version 3.0.2 of the GJXDM has been superseded by Version 3.0.3 but its use is still permitted.

== See also ==
- Automated Trusted Information Exchange
- Homeland Security Information Network
- ISO/IEC 11179
- Metadata registry
- National Criminal Intelligence Sharing Plan
- National Information Exchange Model
- Regional Information Sharing Systems
