= ISO/IEC 11179 =

Standard for metadata registries

The ISO/IEC 11179 metadata registry (MDR) standard is an international ISO/IEC standard for representing metadata for an organization in a metadata registry. It documents the standardization and registration of metadata to make data understandable and shareable.

== Structure of an ISO/IEC 11179 metadata registry ==
The ISO/IEC 11179 model is a result of two principles of semantic theory, combined with basic principles of data modelling.

The first principle from semantic theory is the thesaurus type relation between wider and more narrow (or specific) concepts, e.g. the wide concept "income" has a relation to the more narrow concept "net income".

The second principle from semantic theory is the relation between a concept and its representation, e.g., "buy" and "purchase" are the same concept although different terms are used.

A basic principle of data modelling is the combination of an object class and a characteristic. For example, "Person - hair color".

When applied to data modelling, ISO/IEC 11179 combines a wide "concept" with an "object class" to form a more specific "data element concept". For example, the high-level concept "income" is combined with the object class "person" to form the data element concept "net income of person". Note that "net income" is more specific than "income".

The different possible representations of a data element concept are then described with the use of one or more data elements. Differences in representation may be a result of the use of synonyms or different value domains in different data sets in a data holding. A value domain is the permitted range of values for a characteristic of an object class. An example of a value domain for "sex of person" is "M = Male, F = Female, U = Unknown". The letters M, F and U are then the permitted values of sex of person in a particular data set.

The data element concept "monthly net income of person" may thus have one data element called "monthly net income of individual by 100 dollar groupings" and one called "monthly net income of person range 0-1000 dollars", etc., depending on the heterogeneity of representation that exists within the data holdings covered by one ISO/IEC 11179 registry. Note that these two examples have different terms for the object class (person/individual) and different value sets (a 0-1000 dollar range as opposed to 100 dollar groupings).

The result of this is a catalogue of sorts, in which related data element concepts are grouped by a high-level concept and an object class, and data elements grouped by a shared data element concept. Strictly speaking, this is not a hierarchy, even if it resembles one.

ISO/IEC 11179 proper does not describe data as it is actually stored. It does not refer to the description of physical files, tables and columns. The ISO/IEC 11179 constructs are "semantic" as opposed to "physical" or "technical".

The standard has two main purposes: definition and exchange. The core object is the data element concept, since it defines a concept and, ideally, describes data independent of its representation in any one system, table, column or organisation.

== Structure of the ISO/IEC 11179 standard ==
The standard consists of seven parts:

- ISO/IEC 11179-1:2015 Framework (referred to as ISO/IEC 11179-1)
- ISO/IEC 11179-2:2005 Classification
- ISO/IEC 11179-3:2013 Registry metamodel and basic attributes
- ISO/IEC 11179-4:2004 Formulation of data definitions
- ISO/IEC 11179-5:2015 Naming and identification principles
- ISO/IEC 11179-6:2015 Registration
- ISO/IEC 11179-7:2019 Metamodel for data set registration

Part 1 explains the purpose of each part. Part 3 specifies the metamodel that defines the registry. Part 7 is released per December 2019 and provides an extension to part 3 for registration of metadata about data sets. The other parts specify various aspects of the use of the registry.

== Overview of 11179 Data Element ==
The data element is foundational concept in an ISO/IEC 11179 metadata registry. The purpose of the registry is to maintain a semantically precise structure of data elements.

Each Data element in an ISO/IEC 11179 metadata registry:

- should be registered according to the Registration guidelines (11179-6)
- will be uniquely identified within the register (11179-5)
- should be named according to Naming and Identification Principles (11179-5) See data element name
- should be defined by the Formulation of Data Definitions rules (11179-4) See data element definition and
- may be classified in a Classification Scheme (11179-2) See classification scheme

Data elements that store "Codes" or enumerated values must also specify the semantics of each of the code values with precise definitions.

== Adoption of 11179 standards ==
Software AG's COTS Metadata Registry (MDR) product supports the ISO 11179 standard and continues to be sold and used for this purpose in both commercial and government applications (see Vendor Tools section below).

While commercial adoption is increasing, the spread of ISO/IEC 11179 has been more successful in the public sector. However, the reason for this is unclear. ISO membership is open to organizations through their national bodies. Countries with public sector repositories across various industries include Australia, Canada, Germany, United States and the United Kingdom.

The United Nations and the US Government refer to and use the 11179 standards. 11179 is strongly recommended on the U.S. government's XML website. and is promoted by The Open Groups as a foundation of the Universal Data Element Framework. The Open Group is a vendor-neutral and technology-neutral consortium working to enable access to integrated information within and between enterprises based on open standards and global interoperability.

== Extensions to the ISO/IEC 11179 standard ==
Although the ISO/IEC 11179 metadata registry is 6-part standard comprising several hundreds of pages, the primary model is presented in Part-3 and depicted in UML diagrams to facilitate understanding, supported by normative text. The eXtended Metadata Registry initiative, XMDR led by the US, explored the use of ontologies as the basis for MDR content in order to provide richer semantic framework than could be achieved by lexical and syntax naming conventions alone. The XMDR experimented with a prototype using OWL, RDF and SPARQL to prove the concept. The initiative resulted in Edition 3 of ISO/IEC 11179. The first part published is ISO/IEC 11179-3:2013. The primary extension in Edition 3 is the Concept Region, expanding the use of concepts to more components within the standard, and supporting registration of a Concept system for use within the registry. The standard also supports the use of externally defined concept systems. Edition 3 versions of Parts 1, 5, and 6 were published in 2015. Part 2, Classifications, is subsumed by the Concept Region in Part 3, but is being updated to a Technical Report (TR) to provide guidance on the development of Classification Schemes. Part 4 describes principles for forming data definitions; an Edition 3 has not been proposed.

== Examples of ISO/IEC 11179 metadata registries ==
The following metadata registries state that they follow ISO/IEC 11179 guidelines although there have been no formal third party tests developed to test for metadata registry compliance.

- Aristotle Metadata Registry Wikipedia page
- Australian Institute of Health and Welfare - Metadata Online Registry (METeOR)
- Minnesota Department of Education Metadata Registry (K-12 Data)
- Minnesota Department of Revenue Property Taxation (Real Estate Transactions)
- Ohio State University - open Metadata Repository (openMDR)
- US Department of Justice - Global Justice XML Data Model GJXDM
- US Environmental Protection Agency - Environmental Data Registry
- US Health Information Knowledgebase (USHIK)
- US National Cancer Institute - Cancer Data Standards Repository (caDSR)
- US National Information Exchange Model NIEM

== Metadata registry vendor tools that claim ISO/IEC 11179 compliance ==
- Nurocor MDR
- Software AG's OneData Metadata Registry
- SALUS MDR Project - EU
- Aristotle Metadata Registry (open source registry)
- Data Element Hub

No independent agencies certify ISO/IEC 11179 compliance. To some extent, certain existing software implementations suffer from poor design, messy code, and potential security vulnerabilities, which hinder the adoption of ISO/IEC 11179.

== Alternatives ==
Open Metadata

== See also ==
- Data dictionary
- Data reference model
- Global Justice XML Data Model
- National Information Exchange Model
- Representation term
- Semantic Web
- Universal Data Element Framework
- METeOR
- NCI caDSR
- Metadata standards
- ISO/IEC JTC 1/SC 32
- ISO/IEC JTC 1/SC 32/WG 2
