= D1 =

D1, D01, D.I, D.1 or D-1 can refer to:

== Science and technology ==
=== Biochemistry and medicine ===
- ATC code D01 Antifungals for dermatological use, a subgroup of the Anatomical Therapeutic Chemical Classification System
- Dopamine receptor D_{1}, a protein
- Haplogroup D1 (Y-DNA)
- Vitamin D_{1}, a form of Vitamin D
- DI, Iodothyronine deiodinase type I, an enzyme involved with thyroid hormones

=== Technology ===
- Nikon D1, a digital single-lens reflex camera
  - Nikon D1X, an updated version of the D1
  - Nikon D1H, an updated version of the D1
- D1, former brand of T-Mobile in Germany
- D1, an abbreviation for DOCSIS 1.0 1.0, an international telecommunications standard
- D-1 (Sony), an early digital video recording format
- STS-61-A, also known as D-1, the 22nd mission of NASA's Space Shuttle program
- D-1, from the Proton (rocket family), Russian rockets
- Mercedes D.I, a 1913 German aircraft engine

== Military ==
=== World War I fighter aircraft ===
- AEG D.I
- Albatros D.I
- Halberstadt D.I, experimental version of Halberstadt D.II (and Aviatik D.I variant)
- Aviatik (Berg) D.I
- Daimler D.I
- Deutsche Flugzeug-Werke D.I
- Euler D.I
- Flugzeugbau Friedrichshafen D.I
- Fokker D.I
- Hansa-Brandenburg D.I
- Junkers D.I
- Knoller D.I, an Imperial and Royal Aviation Troops aircraft
- Phönix D.I
- Schütte-Lanz D.I
- Siemens-Schuckert D.I
- WKF D.I, an Imperial and Royal Aviation Troops aircraft

=== Other uses in military ===
- Char D1, a 1930s French tank
- Dewoitine D.1, a 1920s French single-seat fighter aircraft
- Dunne D.1, a 1907 British experimental aircraft
- 152 mm howitzer M1943 (D-1), a Soviet World War II artillery system
- HMS D1, British early 20th century submarine
- USS D-1 (SS-17), a 1909 American submarine

== Transportation ==
=== Locomotives and trams ===
- D1-class, a variant of D-class Melbourne tram
- D1 multiple unit, a train built in 1960s-1980s in Hungary for Soviet railways
- BHP Port Kembla D1 class, an Australian diesel locomotive
- LB&SCR D1 class, an 1873 British tank locomotive
- NCC Class D1, a Northern Counties Committee Irish gauge steam locomotive
- Pennsylvania Railroad class D1, an 1868 American steam locomotive
- Victorian Railways D1 class, an Australian steam locomotive
- Bavarian D I, an 1871 Bavarian tank locomotive
- Min'an Electric D01, a prototype electric sports car

=== Roads ===
- D1 road (Croatia)
- D1 motorway (Czech Republic)
- D1 motorway (Slovakia)

=== Other uses in transportation ===
- D1, a model of BSA Bantam British motorcycle
- D1, a commuter rail line of Moscow Central Diameters
- D1, a route of the D (SEPTA Metro)
- BYD D1, an electric multi purpose vehicle (MPV)

== Sports ==
- NCAA Division I, D-I, the highest division of American collegiate athletics
- D1 Grand Prix, a production car drifting series from Japan
- D1NZ, a production car drifting series in New Zealand

== Other uses ==
- D1 (building), a residential building in Dubai
- D1 (Longs Peak), a technical climbing route in Colorado, U.S.
- D1, a Dublin postal district
- D1, a guitar model by C. F. Martin & Company
- D1, a code in Town and country planning in the United Kingdom
- D1, a transmitter equipped juvenile female bald eagle from the 2011 clutch of the Decorah Bald Eagles
- D1, a discount store chain from Colombia.
- D-1 visa, a non-immigrant U.S. visa
- "D-1", a song from Yves (single) by Loona
- D1 Recordings, an Irish independent techno record label
- D01, ECO code for the Richter–Veresov Attack chess opening
- Digital One - also known as D1 National, a digital radio multiplex in the United Kingdom
- Dhoom, a 2004 Indian Hindi-language action film by Sanjay Gadhvi, first part of the Dhoom film series
- Diablo, a 1997 action role-playing video game by Blizzard Entertainment

== See also ==
- 1D (disambiguation)
- Di (disambiguation)
