= ID =

ID most often refers to:

- Identity document, a document used to verify a person's identity
- Identifier, a symbol which uniquely identifies an object or record

ID or its variants may also refer to:

== People ==
- I. D. Ffraid (1814–1875), Welsh poet and Calvinistic Methodist minister
- I. D. McMaster (1923–2004), American assistant district attorney
- I. D. Serebryakov (1917–1998), Russian lexicographer and translator

== Places ==
- İd or Narman, a town in Turkey
- Idaho, US (postal abbreviation ID)
- Indonesia, ISO 3166-1 alpha-2 country code "ID"
  - Indonesian language, ISO 639-1 language code "ID"

== Arts, entertainment, and media ==
=== Music ===
==== Albums ====
- I.D. (album), 1989, by The Wailers Band
- ID (Michael Patrick Kelly album), a 2017 studio album by Michael Patrick Kelly
- Id (Siddharta album), 1999
- [id] (Veil of Maya album), 2010
- ID, by Anna Maria Jopek
- The Id (album), a 2001 studio album by Macy Gray

==== Songs ====
- "ID" (song), a 2015 single by Kygo
- "I.D.", a 2004 song by Kasabian from their self-titled album
- "The I.D.", a 1998 song by Moloko from their album I Am Not a Doctor

==== Performers ====
- The Id (band), an English new wave/synthpop band
- New:ID, a Filipino boy band

=== Periodicals ===
- I.D. (magazine), an American magazine focusing on Architecture, Graphic and Industrial Design
- i-D, a British fashion magazine
- Ideas and Discoveries (i.D.), a magazine covering science, with heavy interest in social science

=== Television ===
- "I.D." (Law & Order), an episode of Law & Order
- Investigation Discovery, an American cable television channel

=== Film ===
- I.D. (1995 film), a British film about football hooliganism
- I.D. (2012 film), an Indian Hindi drama
- The Id (film), a 2016 American thriller/horror film

=== Other uses in arts, entertainment, and media ===
- I.D. (play), 2003 British play by Anthony Sher
- Id (comics), a manhwa by Kim Daewoo, art by A. T. Kenny'
- Id, a fictional kingdom in The Wizard of Id, an American comic strip
- iD (video game), a 1986 computer game
- Investigation Discovery, stylized as "ID", an American pay television network

== Brands and enterprises ==
- ID (public relations), a public relations firm
- ID Labs, an American music production and engineering team
- iD Mobile, a telephone network owned by Carphone Warehouse
- Interlink Airlines (IATA airline code ID), an airline based in Johannesburg, South Africa
- Batik Air (IATA airline code ID), an airline based in Jakarta, Indonesia
- Citroën ID, a variant of the Citroën DS car
- Volkswagen ID. series, a series of concept cars that have been promoted into production
- id Software, an American video game developer

== Finance ==
- International dollar, common name for the Geary–Khamis dollar, a hypothetical unit of currency

== Politics ==
- Inclusive Democracy, a project that aims for direct, economic, social, and ecological democracy
- Independent Democrats, a political party in South Africa
- Identity and Democracy, a political group in the European Parliament

== Science, technology, and mathematics ==
=== Biology and medicine ===
- Ide (fish), also spelled Id
- Infectious disease
- Infectious dose
- Insomnia disorder
- Intellectual disability, a generalized neurodevelopmental disorder

=== Computing ===
- Id (programming language), a parallel functional programming language
- iD (software), an editor for OpenStreetMap geodata
- id (Unix), a command to retrieve group and user identification
- .id, the Internet Top Level Domain code for Indonesia
- id, the generic object datatype in the Objective-C programming language
- Instruction decoder, a decoder in CPUs
- Internet Draft, a working document of the IETF

=== Design and engineering ===
- Industrial design, a process of designing products for mass production
- Information design, the practice of presenting information in a way that fosters understanding
- Inside diameter, also 'inner diameter' or 'I.D.'; a dimension commonly used to specify the size of tubing or pipe
- Interaction design, the practice of designing interactive digital products, environments, systems, and services
- Interior design, the art and science of enhancing the interior of a building
- Instructional design, the study of creating better instructional experiences

=== Mathematics ===
- Identity function, a function that always returns the same value that was used as its argument
- Influence diagram, a graphical and mathematical representation of a decision situation
- Icosidodecahedron, a uniform polyhedron

=== Psychology ===
- Id, one of the Id, ego and superego psychic apparatus defined in Sigmund Freud's structural model of the psyche

== Other uses ==
- (law) Id., Latin, short for idem (translation: "the same"), used in legal citations to refer to the previous citation
- (linguistics) Indonesian language (ISO 639-1 code "id"), a standardized register of Malay
- (linguistics) Id (cuneiform), a common-use sign in cuneiform texts
- (philosophy) Intelligent design, a pseudoscientific argument for the existence of God
- (sports) ID (classification), a Paralympic rowing classification
- A US Navy hull registration number prefix: Identification number (ID)
- Industrial district, a place where workers and firms, live and work.

== See also ==
- 1D (disambiguation)
- LD (disambiguation)
- Identification (disambiguation)
