= Ident =

Ident or IDENT may refer to:

- Station identification, in broadcasting
- Ident protocol, an Internet protocol that helps identify the user of a particular TCP connection
- Ident (aviation), an identification function in aviation transponders
- IDENT (biometric identication system), a system operated by the DHS

== See also ==
- Identity (disambiguation)
- Identification (disambiguation)
- Identifier
