= D1 class =

D1 class or Class D1 may refer to:

- BHP Port Kembla D1 class, diesel locomotives
- D1-class Melbourne tram
- LB&SCR D1 class, 0-4-2 steam locomotives
- Pennsylvania Railroad class D1, 4-4-0 steam locomotives
- Victorian Railways D1 class, 4-6-0 steam locomotives
