= Intellectual disability sport classification =

Disability sport classification system

Intellectual disability sport classification is a classification system used for disability sport that allows people with intellectual disabilities (Note: In the early 2000s, there was a move away from using the phrase mental retardation. This term appears in a lot of the early literature about intellectual disability sport. Where mental retardation is used in this article, it is done so because of usage of sources.) to fairly compete with and against other people with intellectual disabilities. Separate classification systems exist for the elite athlete with a disability side affiliated with the Paralympic movement and Virtus (formerly known as the International Sports Federation for Persons with Intellectual Disability INAS), and the sports for all model affiliated with Special Olympics. (Note: Unless mentioned otherwise, this article refers to Paralympic and INAS classification as the default.) People with intellectual disabilities have issues with conceptual skills, social skills and practical skills. They have IQs of 75 points or lower, limitations in adaptive behaviour and their disability manifested and was documented prior to turning 18 years of age.

ID sport classification started in earnest internationally in 1985 following the creation of INAS. INAS went on to be a founding member of the International Paralympic Committee. ID sportspeople first competed at their own Paralympic Games in 1992, and at the Paralympic Games in 1996. Following a cheating scandal in 2000, ID sports were removed from the Paralympic program for 2004 and 2008 before being reinstated for the 2012 Games.

Intellectual disabilities impact sport performances in a number of ways including causing slower reaction times, less strength, endurance, agility, flexibility and balance. Different coaching strategies are implemented when working with sportspeople with intellectual disabilities. Classification tends to be a two step process. The first is to verify the intellectual disability, often through the use of an IQ test coupled with other diagnostic criteria. After this, sport specific functional classification takes place. This can include watching a person in competition, giving them tests, doing a pacing test or some other test.

== Definition and minimal disability type ==
In general, ID sport requires sportspeople to meet three criteria for minimal disability. These include having issues with conceptual skills, social skills and practical skills. Conceptual skills include having issues with language, reading and writing, numbers and money, and ability for self directed learning. Social skills includes having issues with interpersonal communication, naïveté, ability to understand and follow rules and the law, and inability to avoid victimization. Practical skills involve ability to function independently in everyday life.

Organizations that serve people with intellectual disabilities may use other classification systems using World Health Organization or American Psychiatric Association DSM definitions. These definitions may inform their delivery of sporting programs on the local and national level independent of elite sports programs designed for people with intellectual disabilities. They have their roots in earlier classification systems for people with intellectual disabilities, with one of the most widely used one being created in 1961 by the American Association on Mental Retardation, and classing people with an IQ below 85 as having Intellectual Disability. In 1983, this definitions was supplemented to include other variables including interpersonal and sensorimotor skills.

American Association of Intellectual and Development Disabilities (AAIDD) have one such system that is used in the United States. The 2010 AAIDD definition is the basis for Virtus' classification eligibility. Their system is looks like:

AAIDD Intellectual/Developmental Disability Levels
Intellectual Disability level	IQ scores	Ref
Mild Intellectual Disability	IQ 50–55 to 70-75	
Moderate Intellectual Disability	IQ 35–40 to 50-55	
Severe Intellectual Disability	IQ 20–25 to 35-40	
Profound Intellectual Disability	IQ less than 20-25	

Diagnostic usage of this system and similar systems are often used when it comes to funneling people into sports pathways for people with intellectual disabilities, be it at the school level, through Special Olympics or through elite sport programs affiliated with Virtus or the Paralympic movement. Virtus' classification system requires a maximum ID of 75, and that for conceptual, social, and practical adaptive skills, people score at least 2 below the standard deviation in one of these three categories, and that the intellectual disability have manifested itself before the person turned 18 years old. Their disability needs to impact their sport performance, and they often have to meet a minimum age requirement. People who are mildly autistic are not likely to be eligible to compete at Virtus or the Paralympic level. Common classes of intellectual disabilities that meet minimum eligibility requirements for Special Olympics include Fragile X Syndrome, Down Syndrome, Autism Spectrum Disorders, and people with Fetal Alcohol Syndrome or Apert Syndrome. In a few cases, it also includes people who acquired their disability as children as a result of traumatic head injuries during childhood.

== Governance ==
Virtus (formerly known as International Sports Federation for Persons with Intellectual Disability - INAS) is the global governing body for competitive sport for people with intellectual disabilities. At the Paralympic Games, the relevant international sport organization takes over classification. In Australia, classification on the national level is governed by Sporting Inclusion Australia (SIA). Sportspeople classified nationally in Australia are not guaranteed that they will meet international classification standards. Locally, Australian eligibility may also be handled by Lifestream Australia. As it relates to sport specific classification in Australia, Swimming Australia supports the relevant classifying agencies in classification assessment. In New Zealand, classification for ID sportspeople is handled by Paralympics New Zealand. In the United Kingdom, classification may be handled on a sport specific basis in partnership with UK Sports Association. For athletics, this is handled by British Athletics. For swimming in Scotland, it is handled by Scottish Disability Sport in partnership with British Para-Swimming.

Under the sport for all model, ID sport classification is handled by Special Olympics. In the United States, ID sport-for-all is handled by Special Olympics USA.

== Physiology and performance ==
Testing has shown that people with intellectual disabilities often have less strength, endurance, agility, flexibility, balance and slower running speeds than the non-disabled. They also have lower peak heart rates and lower peak oxygen uptake. Many people with intellectual disabilities also have hearing or vision related disabilities. People with Down syndrome often have a condition called ligamentous laxity, which results in increased flexibility in their joints of their neck. 15% of people with Down syndrome have atlantoaxial instability and decreases in muscle tone. This places them at increased risk of spinal cord injuries.

Intellectual disabilities cause issues with sport performance because of issues with reaction time and processing speed, attention and concentration, working memory, executive function, reasoning and visual-spatial perception. These things are all important components of sports intelligence. Successful coaching strategies differ from other sports. Coaches need to be more effusive with praise, not assume that athletes will understand and retain what they are told, focusing on improving overall physical ability to improve competition performance, focus more skills while playing rather than as independent drills removed from the sport, and revisit concepts often. People with mild levels of Intellectual Disability have performance levels similar to non-disabled sportspeople.

== History ==
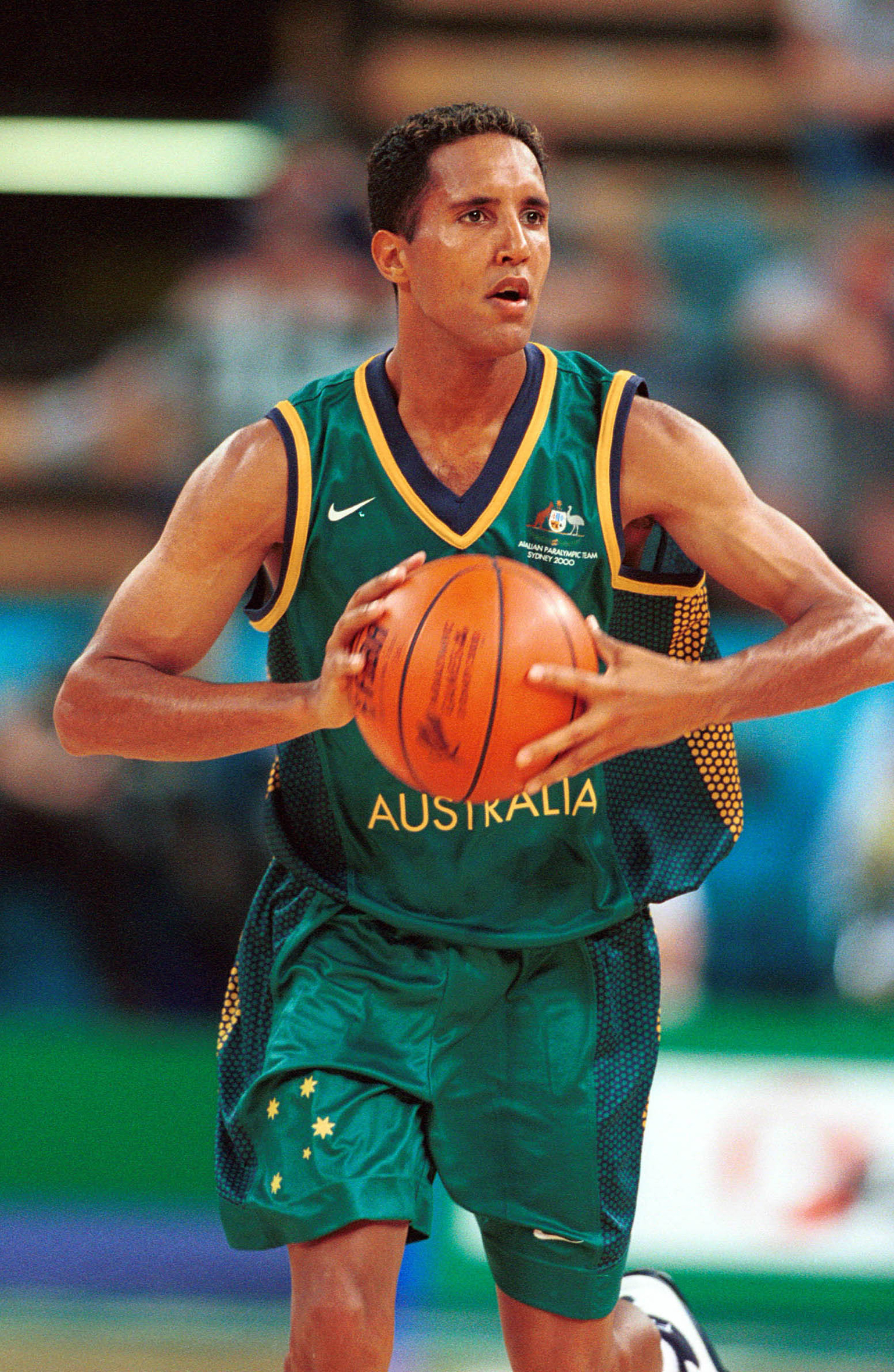
Australian ID basketball player Nicholas Maroney at the 2000 Summer Paralympics

Virtus (formerly known as INAS) was founded in 1986, and was a founding member of the International Paralympic Committee. The same year, some national ID sport organizations were created around the globe including AUSRAPID in Australia. These organizations than affiliated with INAS.

In the early 1990s, sports people from this disability group had available as options on the elite level included basketball, athletics, indoor soccer, swimming and table tennis. These sports were the ones on offer at the first INAS World Games in 1990. The first competition similar to the Paralympic Games for people with intellectual disabilities took place in 1992 in Madrid. It was organized by the Association National Prestura de Servicio (ANDE) and INAS-FID. At these Games in 1992, attitudes towards people with ID were oftentimes reflective of attitudes towards these people at the time. The Australian national delegation to the Madrid was given a lecture about how they were not to have sex with anyone at all during the Games, despite the fact that some members of the Australian delegation were married and were attending the Games with their married partners. If they were considering sex, they were told to first consult the team doctor. These types of discussions were less common than they were with other disability group types including wheelchair sportspeople.

Sportspeople with intellectual disabilities competed at the Winter Paralympics for the first time in 1992 in alpine skiing and cross country skiing. These were demonstration events. For the 1994 Winter Paralympics, biathlon was added as a demonstration sport. Athletes with intellectual disabilities have not competed at a Winter Paralympics since 1998.

The 1996 Summer Paralympics in Atlanta were the first Paralympic Games where ID sportspeople had full medal events. The only available sports were athletics and swimming, with the events being the long jump and 200 m for athletics. 23 total sportsmen and sportswomen from 13 different countries participated. In swimming, the 50 m and 100 m freestyle events were the only ones on offer, with 33 swimmers from 10 countries participating.

At the 2000 Games in Sydney, 244 ID sportspeople participated in four sports: table tennis, athletics, ID basketball and swimming. Following a cheating scandal at the 2000 Summer Paralympics, people with intellectual disabilities had eligible classes removed from Paralympic sports in December of that year until changes were made to classification. Spanish ID basketball players had participated after being classified as ID players despite not meeting minimum eligibility requirements, which resulted in their medal being stripped from them. In January 2001, INAS was suspended as a member of the IPC. In December 2001, INAS suspension was lifted.

National level Australian ID basketball players

Going into the 2000 Summer Paralympics, the definition for this class was anyone with an IQ below 75 points. Following the Games in response to issues with who meets minimum disability requirements, INAS suggested an endorsed certification using the SIC-Q assessment tool for IQ testing as a way around potential manipulation. This was rejected by the IPC.

Restrictions related to intellectual disability classes were lifted, and these sportspeople were allowed to participate at the 2012 Summer Paralympics in London. The decision was made following a meeting of the IPC General Assembly in Kuala Lumpur, Malaysia in November 2009. The first sport to re-include ID sportspeople was swimming, who put swimmers in the S14 class. Their first IPC sanctioned sporting event was in October 2009 at a European Championship in Iceland. Sports on the program for the London Games including swimming, athletics, and table tennis. Events on the London program for athletics included the long jump, shot put and 1,500 m. For swimming, it was the 200 m freestyle, 100 m breaststroke, and 100 m backstroke. 119 ID sportspeople participated in the 2012 Summer Paralympics.

The eligibility requirements for table tennis were finalized in November 2010 by the International Table Tennis Federation. IPC Swimming implemented a revision to their classification code as it relates to ID sportspeople in 2011. IPC Athletics implemented a revision to their ID classification system in September 2011 in time for the INAS World Games. In 2011, England and Wales Cricket Board appointed a classification officer to handle classification for ID cricket players. In 2012, INAS-FID supported a number of elite sports including athletics, basketball, cycling, soccer, judo, Nordic skiing, swimming, tennis and table tennis.

== Classes ==
Sometimes, sportspeople with intellectual disabilities are integrated into competitions with other disability and non-disability sportspeople. They compete in their own classification indicating they have such a disability.

ID Sport	Internationally	Australia	Great Britain	United States	Ref
Athletics	T20, F20	T20, F20, ID			
Adaptive rowing	ID	II	RSS-LD	ID, LTA, TA, AS	
Cycling		I1, I2			
Equestrian	Grade III			Grade III	
ID football	ID		Learning Disability		
Swimming	S14				
Table tennis	Class 11				

Some sports are not open via their IFs to people with intellectual disabilities on the elite level. This includes cycling. It is also true for lawn bowls and sailing. Sports supported by the Special Olympics including track and field, soccer, basketball, ten-pin bowling, and aquatics. Many of these sports have local and national organizations that have signed memorandums of understanding with their national Special Olympics organizations, with Gymnastics Australia being an example in Australia. Classification for Special Olympics often uses groupings based on performance times or performance levels. This is different than the Paralympics where classification is done based on function or medical definitions.

=== Athletics ===
Athletics is open to ID sportspeople. Internationally, T20 and F20 are the classes used. For sportspeople in this class, they need to have a maximum IQ of 75 using the WISC-R or WAIS-III system, have had their disability manifested and documented prior to being 18 years old, and have demonstrated issues with self-care and interpersonal interactions. Part of sport specific classification for athletics is a pacing test.

In Australia, athletics has sometimes referred to this class as ID. Athletics is a sport governed by Special Olympics, with its own rules for the sport implemented both internationally and nationally.

=== Cycling ===
Cycling classification can take place on the national level. In Australia, there are two such classes: I1 and I2. The first is used for national competitions and the second is for Australians competing internationally. Intentionally, it is not a Paralympic sport, with classification handled internationally by INAS.

=== Equestrian ===
In equestrian, riders with intellectual disabilities may be classified as Grade III in some FEI competitions and in US sanctioned competitions. Sport specific classification is handle by anFEI approved Classifier .

=== ID football ===
ID football classification is managed by Virtus, and has the same minimum requirements as most other sports including having the disability manifest before age 18, having an IQ 75 or under and where the disability impacts behavior and sporting performance. The same classification process is used for 11-a-side association football and for futsal.

In England, The FA is in charge of governance for ID football, where this class is referred to as Learning Disability. In England, eligibility for football is based on meeting all the national eligibility requirements spelled out by the all UK Sports Association National Eligibility. Written confirmation of this needs to be provided by an educational psychologist.

=== Rowing ===
Rowing is not open to ID athletes internationally at the Paralympic level. It is sometimes available nationally or on the club level. This is true for parts of the US, where the class name is ID and it is defined as, "ID athletes can be classified as LTA, TA or AS, depending on their disability. Ability to row will depend on the severity of the intellectual disability." Rowers with an intellectual disability can compete domestically in Great Britain where the class is called RSS-LD. Eligibility for this class is defined as "eligibility must be evidenced verifying an IQ test at Full Scale score of 75 or lower. This test must be conducted before the Age of 18, or by a signed declaration from a school teacher, medical doctor, psychologist stating clearly the evidence on which the diagnosis of age of onset pre- 18 is based." These rowers use a sliding seat.

FISA does have an international rowing class, and uses Virtus standards from 2007 to determine eligibility. Virtus handles all the classification for ID rowers, with FISA checking eligibility based on the Virtus master list. Rowers in Australia participate in the national ID class II. They need to appear on the Virtus Master List or be registered with SIA to be eligible.

=== Swimming ===
The IPC swimming class open to ID swimmers is S14. The sport was the first one to open up to ID sportspeople following the disability's reinclusion on the Paralympic level in November 2009 following their suspension as a result of cheating at the 2000 Summer Paralympics in Sydney. Swimmers on the international level are required to be a minimal age set by FINA for their discipline, need to have a formal diagnosis using international standards, and have evidence that their disability results in a functional impairment that means they could not compete fairly against people who do not have a disability. For sportspeople in this class, they need to have a maximum IQ of 75 using the WISC-R or WAIS-III system, have had their disability manifested and documented prior to being 18 years old, and have demonstrated issues with self-care and interpersonal interactions. Swimming uses a number of sport specific tests for eligibility. The Corsi test is one. It tests memory capacity, with a cut-off score of 6.69. The Tower of London test is used to check executive function. It has a cut-off score of 12.43. Block design is used for visual spatial ability, with a cut-off score of 58.31. For the Special Olympics, the minimum qualification is having trained in swimming for at least 6 weeks and must be at least 8 years old.

People with intellectual disabilities may have a number of conditions that impact their swimming. This includes attention deficit, auditory perception disorder, interaction difficulty, kinetic system disorder, memory and understanding difficulty, expressive language disorder, seizure disorders, vestitublar system disorder and visual perception disorder. ID swimmers have a slower stroke rate than people without disabilities.

=== Table tennis ===
ID table tennis players compete on the elite level in Class 11. For sportspeople in this class, they need to have a maximum IQ of 75 using the WISC-R or WAIS-III system, have had their disability manifested and documented prior to being 18 years old, and have demonstrated issues with self-care and interpersonal interactions. In table tennis, players are asked to demonstrate several types of serves as part of sport specific testing.

In table tennis, there is little difference in technical proficiency during practice and during competition for flick, topspin forehand, and topspin backhand. At the same time, there is no relationship between technical proficiency for contra, block, and push during practice and during competition.

== Getting classified ==
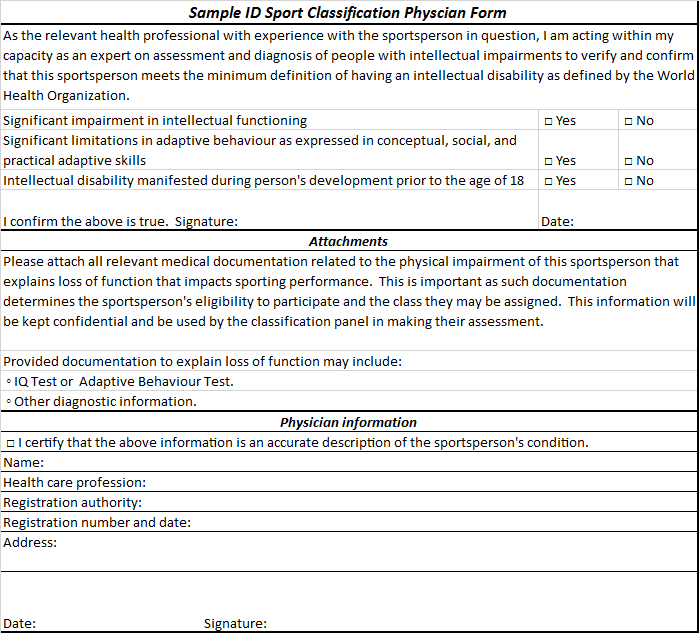
Sample form for use for medical classification for ID sports

Classification for intellectual disabilities has included a number of criteria over the years. This includes using IQ test scored, having a medical diagnosis for an intellectual disability or having other diagnostic support materials.

Intellectual disability classification is a two step process on the international level. The first step is to determine that the athlete meets the basic medical criteria, and this is managed by Virtus in coordination with their national member organisations. Tests that are eligible to document IQ include Raven Progressive Matrices, Stanford Binet, and Wechsler Intelligence Scales, whilst adaptive behaviour is assessed by Vineland Adaptive Behaviour Scales, ABAS Adaptive Behavior Scales, AAMR Adaptive Behaviour Scales or through clinical observation

For athletes who wish to enter Paralympic-level competition, a second step is done involving sport specific classification by technical experts familiar with the sport. Sport-specific classification is managed by the sports International Federation and includes the Sport Cognition Test Battery. This involves psychometric tests that can be administered non-verbally using large touchscreen computers and are sometimes coupled with other tests conducted without a computer at a desk. This is then coupled with TSAL-Q, a questionnaire that explains total time training and experience with the sport. It also includes in competition observation. In swimming, after the competition, the race will likely be reviewed using video analysis to look at stroke speed in the pool. This information is then compared to create a sportsperson profile which is compared to a baseline of non-disabled sportspeople to determine Paralympic eligibility.

Swimming uses a number of sport specific tests for eligibility. The Corsi test is one. It tests memory capacity, with a cut-off score of 6.69. The Tower of London test is used to check executive function. It has a cut-off score of 12.43. Block design is used for visual spatial ability, with a cut-off score of 58.31.

Part of sport specific classification for athletics is a pacing test. Sport specific classification is handled internationally by classifiers from the International Table Tennis Federation. In table tennis, players are asked to demonstrate several types of serves as part of sport specific testing.

== Criticism ==
One of the criticisms around the classification system is the complexity of categorizing people with intellectual disabilities. Another issue is that people who are at the higher functional end of having an intellectual disability have a performance advantage over those with more severe intellectual disabilities.
