= D13 =

D13 may refer to:

- ARA Sarandí (D-13), an Almirante Brown-class destroyer of the Argentine Navy
- Dublin 13, a postal district in Ireland
- Fokker D.XIII, a Dutch fighter aircraft
- General Flores (ship), an Almirante Clemente-class destroyer of the Venezuelan Navy
- LNER Class D13, an English 4-4-0 steam tender locomotive
- Pennsylvania Railroad class D13, an American 4-4-0 steam locomotive; see Pennsylvania Railroad locomotive classification
- D13 series of Honda D engines
- D13, a bald eagle from the 2012 clutch of the Decorah Bald Eagles
