= LD =

LD may refer to:

== Arts and entertainment ==
=== Film and television ===
- Lorraine "L.D." Delacorte, a character on the TV series Degrassi
- Larry David, sometimes referred to as L.D. on the television show Curb Your Enthusiasm
- Latin Disciples, a fictional gang in television series Day Break
- Living Dangerously (wrestling series), an Extreme Champion Wrestling pay-per-view event (ECW PPV)
- Low-definition television (LDTV)
- "-LD", a United States call sign suffix signifying a low-power digital television station
- LaserDisc or MCA Discovision is a 12 inch Analog Video optical disc

=== Music ===
- Lil Dicky (born 1988), American rapper
- Little Doses, a Scottish alternative rock band
- Luis Dubuc (born 1985), American musician
- LD (rapper), British rapper
- Lemon Demon, American musical project and band

=== Other uses in arts and entertainment ===
- Lighting designer, a person in charge of lighting in theatre

== Businesses and organizations ==
- Air Hong Kong (IATA code LD)
- Light Dragoons, a British Army cavalry regiment
- Línea Turística Aereotuy (IATA code LD)
- London Drugs, a Canadian pharmacy and retail chain
- Louis Dreyfus Company, a French commodities trading firm

== Economics and finance ==
=== Contract law ===
- Liability damages
- Liquidated damages

=== Currencies ===
- Liberian dollar, the currency of Liberia
- Libyan dinar, the currency of Libya
- Liberty dollar (private currency), produced in the US

== Places ==
- LD postcode area, also known as the Llandrindod Wells postcode area, in Wales
- Lakshadweep, India (ISO 3166-2 code LD)
- County Longford, Ireland (code LD)

== Politics ==
- Liberal democracy, a form of government based on rule of the people (democracy) tempered by the rule of law and natural rights (liberalism)
- Lincoln–Douglas debate, a form of debate
- Liberal Democrats (UK), a UK political party
- Lord, a peer of the realm in the United Kingdom

== Science, technology, and mathematics ==
=== Astronomy ===
- Lilian day, a variant of the Julian day
- Lunar distance, the distance between the Earth and the Moon, used as a general measure of distance

=== Biology and medicine ===
- Lactate dehydrogenase, an enzyme in plants and animals
- Lateral dorsal nucleus of thalamus, an anatomic structure of the brain
- Learning disability, a condition that can impair learning through standard methods
- Lethal dose, an indication of the lethal toxicity of a given substance or type of radiation
- Licensed Dietitian
- Linkage disequilibrium, in genetics, when alleles occur together more often than they would by chance
- Lucid dreaming, a dream in which one is conscious of dreaming as it is happening

=== Electronics and computing ===
- ld, an instruction on a Z80 CPU
- ld (Unix), the linker command on Unix and Unix-like systems
- Laser diode, semiconductor laser-emitting device
- LaserDisc, an obsolete optical disc video/data format and predecessor to DVD
- Levenshtein distance, a string metric for measuring the difference between two sequences.
- Line Dubbed, a term for unlicensed copies of films with an audio track, which has been ripped from the line out connection of a projector
- Linked data, a method of publishing structured data so that it can be interlinked and become more useful
- The 'Linked Document' in the NISO standard Content Profile/Linked Document, a data serialisation format

=== Telecommunications ===
- Long-distance calling, a telephone call charged at a higher rate
- Loop Disconnect dialing

=== Other uses in science and technology ===
- (chemistry) D/L nomenclature, used in naming chemical compounds
- (linguistics) Language Development, the changes that take place in language, speech & communication in the context of children's development
- (manufacturing) Linz-Donawitz process, a widely used process in Basic oxygen steelmaking
- (mathematics) Binary logarithm, $\mathrm{ld}(x)=\log_2(x)$, from the Latin logarithmus dualis
- (military) Laser designator, used by the military for targeting
- (physics) London dispersion force, weak intermolecular forces
- (statistics) Listwise deletion, a method of handling missing data

== Other uses ==
- LD (cigarette), a brand of cigarette
- (communications) Lincoln–Douglas debate format
- (sociology) Long-distance relationship
- (sports) Line drive, in baseball
- (sports) Ludum Dare, a game development competition

== See also ==
- eLDee, Nigerian rapper and record producer
- 1D (disambiguation), similar in glyphic structure to "lD"/"ld"(1d)
- ID (disambiguation), similar in glyphic structure to "lD"/"ld"(Id)
- Ladder diagram (disambiguation), various meanings
