= Identity =

Identity most often refers to:

- Identity document, a document proving a person's identity
- Identity (philosophy), the relation each thing bears only to itself
- Identity (social science), which characterizes a person or a group
- Identity (mathematics), an equation that is always true for any value of its variables

Identity may also refer to:

== Arts and entertainment ==
=== Film and television ===
- Identity (1987 film), an Iranian film
- Identity (2003 film), an American mystery psychological thriller film
- Identity (2025 film), a Malayalam action-thriller film
- Identity (game show), an American game show
- Identity (TV series), a British police procedural drama television series
- "Identity" (Arrow), a 2013 episode
- "Identity" (Burn Notice), a 2007 episode
- "Identity" (Charlie Jade), a 2005 episode
- "Identity" (Legend of the Seeker), a 2008 episode
- "Identity" (Law & Order: Special Victims Unit episode), a 2005 episode
- "Identity" (NCIS: Los Angeles), a 2009 pilot episode
- "Identity" (Stewart Lee's Comedy Vehicle), a 2011 episode

=== Music ===
==== Albums ====
- Identity (3T album), 2004
- Identity (BoA album), 2010
- Identity (Far East Movement album), 2016
- Identity (Ronnie Laws album), 1990
- Identity (Robert Pierre album), 2008
- Identity (Raghav album), 2008
- Identity (Victon EP), 2017
- Identity (Zee album), 1984

==== Songs ====
- "Identity" (Sakanaction song), 2010
- "Identity" (X-Ray Spex song), 1978
- "Identity", 1983, by Bucks Fizz, B-side to "London Town"
- "Identity", 2022, by Bush, from The Art of Survival
- "Identity", 2020, by Grandson, from Death of an Optimist
- "Identity", 2024, by MiSaMo, from the EP Haute Couture

==== Other uses in music ====
- Identity (music), in post-tonal music theory
- Identity (tuning), an odd member below and including a limit

=== Publications ===
- Identity, a defunct quarterly Australian magazine published by the Aboriginal Publications Foundation (1971–1982)
- Identity (novel), by Milan Kundera, 1998

== Business ==
- Accounting identity, calculation that must be true regardless of its variables
- Brand identity, the expression of a brand
- Corporate identity, the manner a corporation presents itself to the public

== Philosophy and social science ==
- Identity (philosophy), the relation each thing bears only to itself
- Law of identity, that each thing is identical with itself
- Personal identity, the numerical identity of a person over time
- Identity (social science), qualities etc that characterize a person or group
- Political identity

== Mathematics ==
- Identity (mathematics), an equality that holds regardless of the values of its variables
- Identity element, an element of the set which leaves unchanged every element when the operation is applied
- Identity function, a function that leaves its argument unchanged
- Identity matrix, with ones on the main diagonal, zeros elsewhere

== Science and technology ==
- Digital identity, information used by computer systems to represent an external agent
- Identity (object-oriented programming), the property of objects that distinguishes them from other objects

== Other uses ==
- Identity document, or ID

== See also ==
- Biometrics
- Collective identity
- Cultural diversity
- Cultural identity
- Entity (disambiguation)
- ID (disambiguation)
- Identification (disambiguation)
- Identifier, a name that identifies a unique object or class of objects
- Identity politics
- National identity
- Outline of self
- Personal data
- Personal identity (disambiguation)
- Secret identity (disambiguation)
- The Bourne Identity (disambiguation)
