= Jackie and Shadow =

Wild bald eagles in California

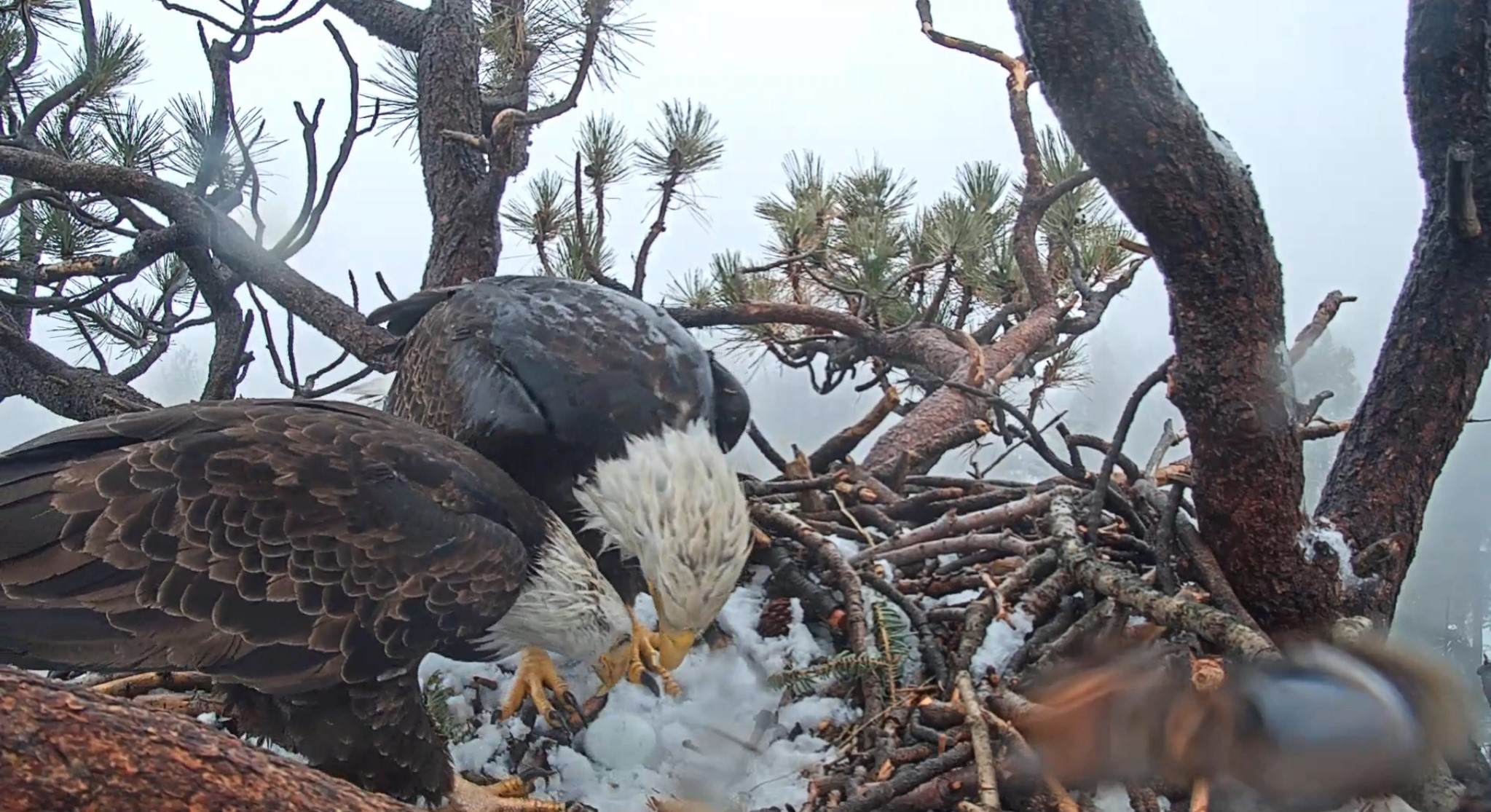
- Jackie and Shadow in 2019
- Species: Bald eagles
- Sex: Female (Jackie); Male (Shadow)
- Hatched: c. 2012 (Jackie) c. 2014 (Shadow); Big Bear Valley, U.S.
- Died: August 10, 2026 (Jackie); Ojai Raptor Center (Jackie)
- Cause of death: Nephritis, anemia resulting from Highly pathogenic avian influenza (Jackie)
- Years active: 2017–2026 (Jackie); 2018–present (Shadow)
- Known for: subjects of Friends of Big Bear Valley livestreams
- Offspring: numerous

Jackie (c. 2012 – August 10, 2026) and Shadow (c. 2014) were a mated pair of bald eagles residing in Big Bear Valley (near Big Bear Lake) in San Bernardino County, California. Their courtship in 2018 and subsequent yearly efforts to hatch and raise offspring together were live-streamed by the nonprofit Friends of Big Bear Valley.

== Background ==
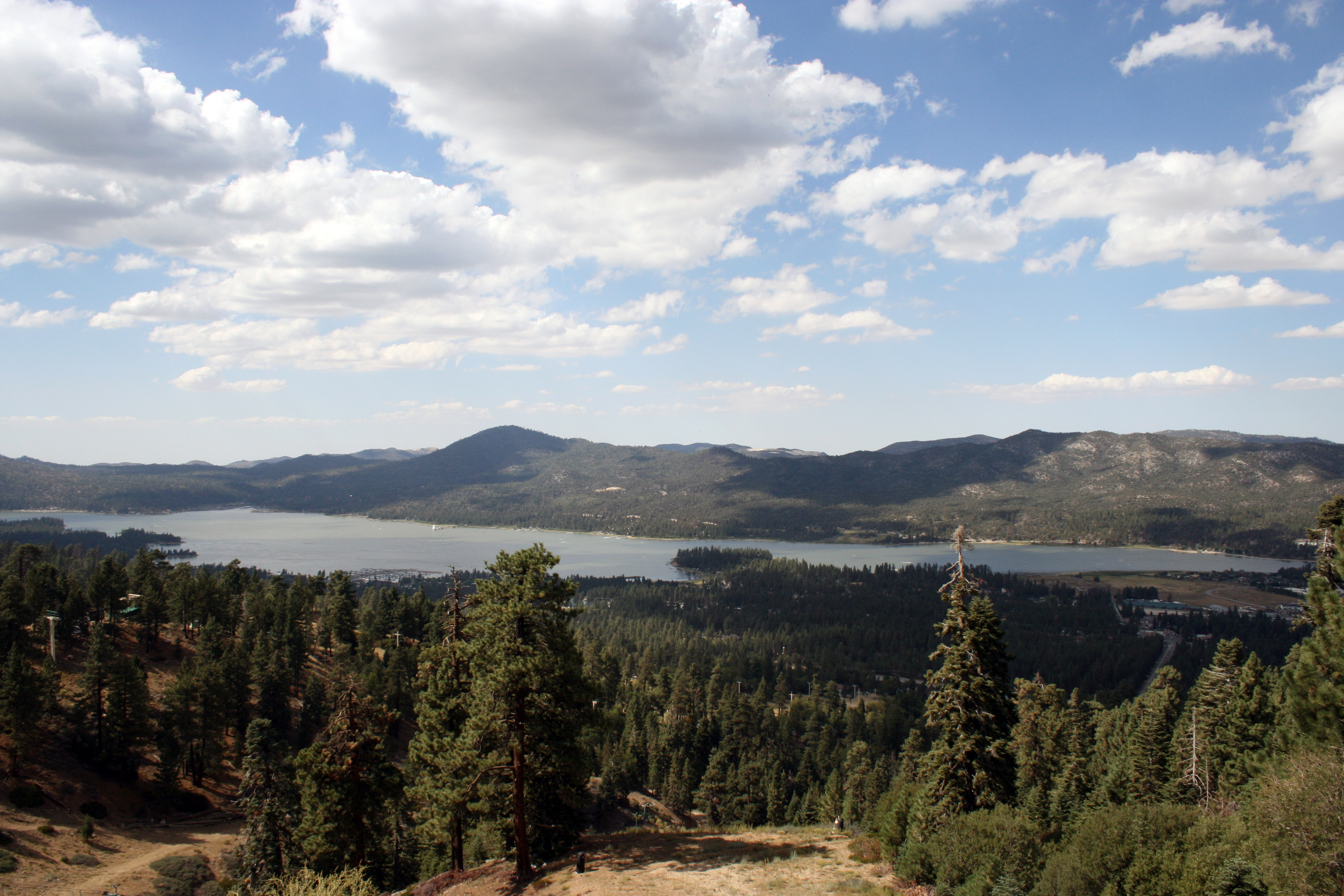
Big Bear Lake in 2007

While bald eagles from points farther north migrate to Big Bear Valley, most do not stay year-round. In 2012, rangers in the San Bernardino National Forest discovered that the valley had become nesting territory for bald eagles. In 2015, the conservation group Friends of Big Bear Valley (FOBBV) launched a livestream to monitor wildlife in the area.

== History ==
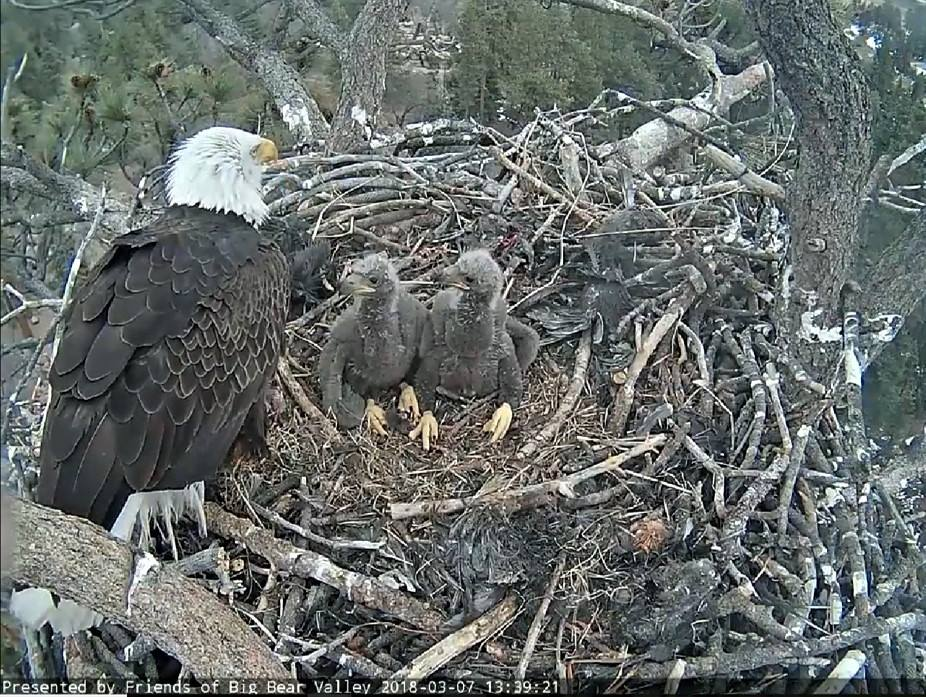
Two of Jackie's eaglets in 2018

Jackie, believed to be the first eaglet hatched in Big Bear Valley, came to the public's attention in 2017, when she and her original mate ("Mr. B") took over an abandoned nest beside FOBBV's livestream camera. Shadow came to the public's attention in 2018 when he vied to replace Mr. B at the nest. Mr. B's sole surviving offspring with Jackie was a male, Stormy, who fledged in late April 2018. Shadow then became Jackie's new mate.

As of 2020, Jackie and Shadow were the only year-round bald eagle residents at Big Bear Lake. During the 2019–2022 seasons, the mated pair produced eleven eggs, three of which successfully hatched, with two eaglets – Simba (male, 2019) and Spirit (2022) – surviving to fledge and disperse independently.

Jackie and Shadow's livestream drew significant public interest in early 2023, when the pair continued incubating their eggs despite frigid conditions and 45 inches (1.1 m) of snow brought to the area by multiple atmospheric rivers, with the snow at times completely blanketing both the nest and the eagles sheltering their clutch. Jackie and Shadow had no hatchlings that year or the following year.

In 2025, the pair successfully hatched three eggs, but one eaglet died 10–11 days later, during a snow storm. The two surviving eaglets, which FOBBV concluded were chicks 2 and 3 in hatching order (based on their foot size and amount of thermal down feathers), were later named Sunny and Gizmo. The names, chosen from 54,000 submissions, were voted on by students at Big Bear Elementary School. The eaglet that died was named Misty, after Kathi Misterly, a FOBBV volunteer who had recently died from cancer. Sunny and Gizmo (both females) fledged within a week of one another in early June 2025. The juveniles intermittently returned to the nest and surrounding area before dispersing.

Jackie laid two eggs in early 2026, but both were eaten by a raven. FOBBV observers noticed egg damage prior to this; therefore, they posit that the eagles allowed ravens access to them. The following month, Jackie laid two more eggs, both of which hatched in April 2026. The eaglets, a male and female, were named Luna and Sandy, the latter named after Sandy Steers (1952–2026), FOBBV's founder and executive director, who conceived of and organized the live-streaming nest-cam. Similar to the previous year, both names were chosen by students at Big Bear Elementary School, who voted on 63,915 submissions. Sandy and Luna fledged within one day of each other in late June 2026, slightly prematurely due to Luna accidentally knocking Sandy off the tree. As of June 29, 2026, both juveniles were off the nest tree and being fed by their parents.

=== Illness and death of Jackie ===
On July 18, 2026, an unidentified eagle was rescued near Dana Point Park on the north shore of Big Bear Lake. The eagle, injured in a fight with two others, was later determined to be Jackie, who had not been seen near her nest in the days prior. She was transported to the Ojai Raptor Center for rehabilitation, where she was found to be underweight and suffering from severe anemia and kidney inflammation. FOBBV had observed signs that Jackie was behaving abnormally before the territorial fights, with her care team subsequently diagnosing severe illness; veterinary teams believed the illness had left her weak and vulnerable to attack. On August 10, 2026, Jackie died while in treatment. Her remains were transferred to the California Department of Fish and Wildlife. The New York Times reported a statement posted on the Ojai Raptor Center's Facebook page, "We know this news will be deeply felt by the many thousands of people around the world who have followed her journey, hoped alongside us, prayed for her, and supported the people caring for her. Our team is heartbroken. It has been an extraordinary privilege to care for her."

A tribute for Jackie was held at Fawn Park in September 2026; it included a shrine and was attended by approximately 300 people. Additionally, California State Senate passed Resolution 140, which proclaims September 4, 2026 to be California Wildlife Day, in remembrance of Jackie.

On October 14, 2026 the California Department of Fish and Wildlife announced the results of necropsy, toxicology, and other laboratory work that, taken together, established Highly Pathogenic Avian Influenza as the cause of Jackie's decline and death. The results ruled out West Nile Virus, heavy metal poisoning, and rodenticide as significant contributors, although rodenticide results were positive.

== Protected area ==
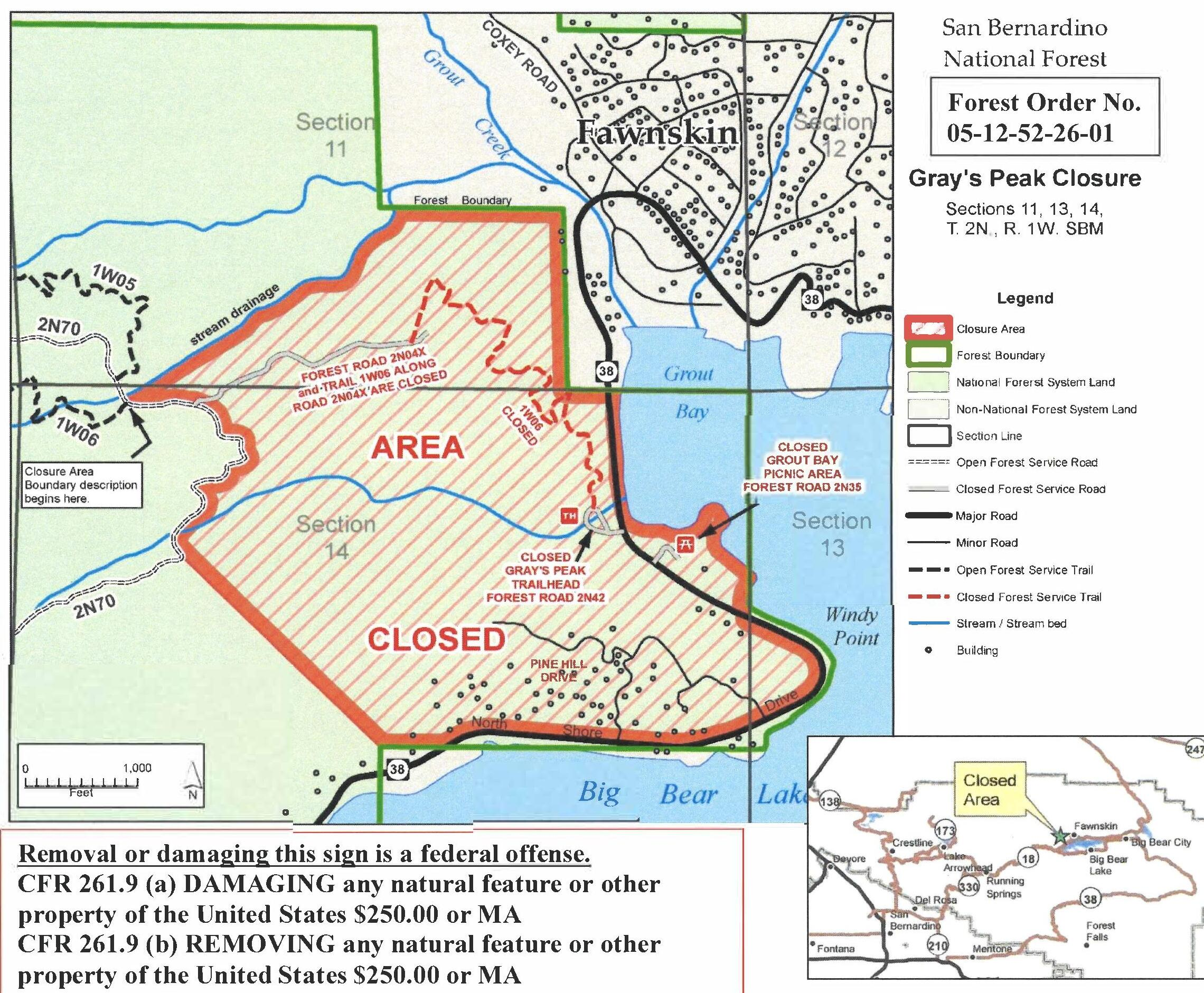
Map of protected area on the 2026 closure notice

Jackie and Shadow's nest is located in the San Bernardino National Forest near Fawnskin, 145 feet (44 m) above ground in a Jeffrey pine. As the tree is near a parking lot, picnic area, and campsite, the Forest Service closes these facilities when offspring are fledging.

For more than 25 years, developers planned to develop a 63-acre (25 ha) stretch of Big Bear Lake's north shore lakefront known as Moon Camp, located less than 1 mile (1.6 km) from Jackie and Shadow's nest. The project faced significant opposition from conservationists and the general public, as it would be detrimental to the bald eagles as well as several rare and endangered plant species. In February 2026, the developer granted the San Bernardino Mountains Land Trust an option to purchase the property for $10 million; the land would then be added to the San Bernardino National Forest. On July 23, 2026, Friends of Big Bear Valley announced that $10.5 million had been secured for the purchase, helped by a $5.5 million donation by Anna and Greg Brockman. The "campaign to save Moon Camp" reached its fundraising goal shortly after Jackie's hospitalization, during a surge in donations and attention following her illness.

== See also ==
- Decorah Bald Eagles – American livestreaming website
- Eagles4kids – Online educational resource
- Southwest Florida Eagle Cam – Birdwatching website
- List of individual birds
