= Dr.I =

Dr.I may refer to the following World War I triplanes:

- AEG Dr.I
- Fokker Dr.I
