= Personal identity (disambiguation) =

Personal identity is the unique non-numerical composition of identity aspects formed by the person about himself or herself through time.

Personal identity may also refer to:

- an umbrella term used throughout the social sciences and personal perception of surrounding human society for an individual's comprehension of him or herself as a discrete, separate human entity
- Personal identity number, is a number assigned to the person and used by national authorities, or for identification for credit card usage and other situations requiring identification of a person in a law environment
- Personally identifiable information, is the information that can be used to uniquely identify a single person; an information needed and used to contact or locate individuum is supplemental and does not form a part of a human identity
- Right to personal identity, is an irrevocable right of each individuum comprising self-sovereign identification independently from the one recognised in the law
- Self-sovereign identity, is an approach based on non-digital but human aspects of a human personality that gives individuals control over the information they use to prove who they are

== See also ==
- Identity (disambiguation)
