= Identification =

Identification or identify may refer to:

- Identity document, any document used to verify a person's identity

== Arts, entertainment and media ==
- Identify (album) by Got7, 2014
- "Identify" (song), by Natalie Imbruglia, 1999
- Identification (album), by Benjamin Ingrosso, 2018
- Station identification, or ident, radio or TV stations identifying themselves on-air
- Kill Command, also known as Identify, a 2016 film

== Science and technology ==
- Identification (information), for data storage
- Identifiability, in statistics
- Identification (biology), assigning a taxon to an individual organism
- Identification scheme, in metadata, used to identify unique records in a set

== Social sciences ==
- Identification (psychology), a concept in psychoanalysis
- Identification in rhetoric, a rhetorical theory of persuasion
- Identification (literature), the audience identifying with a character, or a narrative device

== Other special types of identification ==
- Animal identification, identifying and tracking specific animals
- Human identification (disambiguation)
- Body identification, in forensic science
- Eyewitness identification, in criminal law
- Forensic identification, the application of forensic science
- Identification friend or foe, an identification system designed for command and control
- Language identification, in natural language processing
- Particle identification, in experimental physics
- Programme identification, provided by radio stations
- System identification, building mathematical models of dynamical systems from measured data

== See also ==
- Identification tag (disambiguation)
- Identity (disambiguation)
- ID (disambiguation)
