= Human identification =

Human identification may mean:

- Biometric identification
- Face perception
- Face recognition
- Forensic identification

== See also ==
- Identification (disambiguation)
- Identity document
- Personal data
