= Raptor Resource Project =

US non-profit organization

The Raptor Resource Project is a non-profit organization whose members work to preserve the health and population levels of falcons, eagles, ospreys, hawks and owls. The project, established in 1988, protects more than 40 nests and nesting areas in Minnesota, Wisconsin, Iowa and Colorado.

== Artificial nests ==
One of the project's main activities is safe nesting sites where raptors can raise their young. Power plant stacks have proven to be good locations for these nests. More than 1,000 baby peregrine falcons have been hatched from power plant nests.

== Education ==
The Raptor Resource Project provides education about nest site management and nest creation to future preservationists, in keeping of with their goal of increasing participation in the protection of raptors.

== Research ==
=== Bird cams ===
The RPP also develops and employs non-intrusive methods of viewing the birds and their nest sites, so that scientists and the general public can learn more about the lives of raptors. RPP members have set up cameras which webcast from many raptor nests. They set up their first camera to view a bald eagle nest in Decorah, Iowa. Subsequent webcasts include the Missouri Turkey Vulture Cam, River View Tower Falcon Cam, Eagle Crest Bird Cam, Xcel Fort St. Brain Eagle Cam, Xcel Valmont Owl Cam, Xcel Osprey Cam, Xcel Kestrel Cam, Xcel King Falcons, Xcel Blackdog Falcons, Xcel Sherco Falcons, Elk River Falcons, and the Red Wing Grain Falcons.

=== Banding ===
The organization also participates in the banding of raptors so that their travel paths can be studied.
