= 1D =

1D, 1-D, or 1d can refer to:

- One-dimensional space in physics and mathematics
- Alpha-1D adrenergic receptor
- Astra 1D, a satellite
- Canon EOS-1D, Canon's first professional digital camera
- Long March 1D, a satellite
- One Direction, an English-Irish boy band
- Penny (British pre-decimal coin), routinely abbreviated 1d
- 1D, the hexadecimal code for the Group Separator control character
- Informal for Onedrive, a file hosting system operated by Microsoft

== See also ==
- D1 (disambiguation)
- ID (disambiguation)
- LD (disambiguation)
