= Decorah Bald Eagles =

American livestreaming website

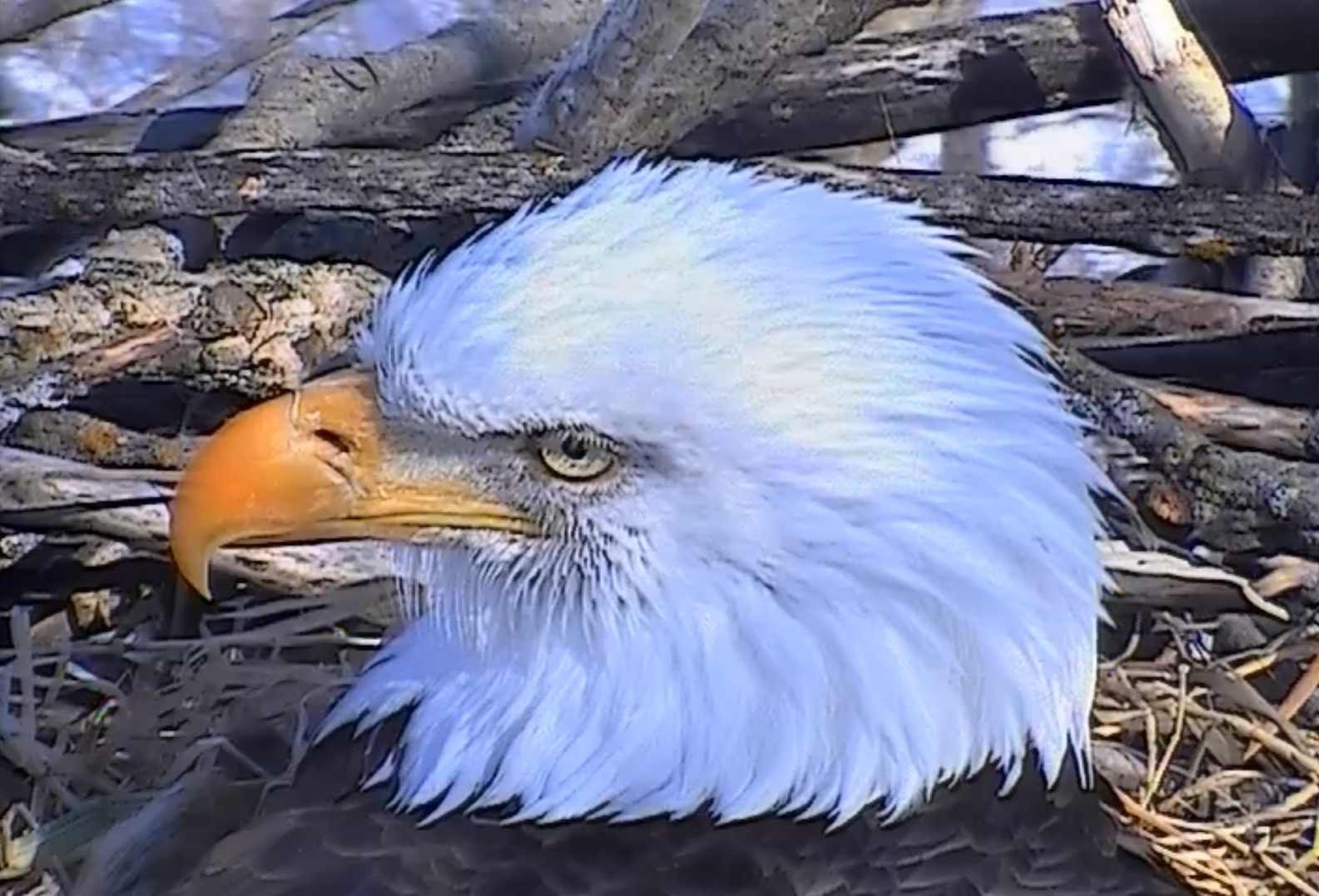
Decorah "Dad", a wild male bald eagle as seen on live-streaming footage hosted by Ustream, 2014. Cameras above the nest are equipped with zooming and panning capabilities.

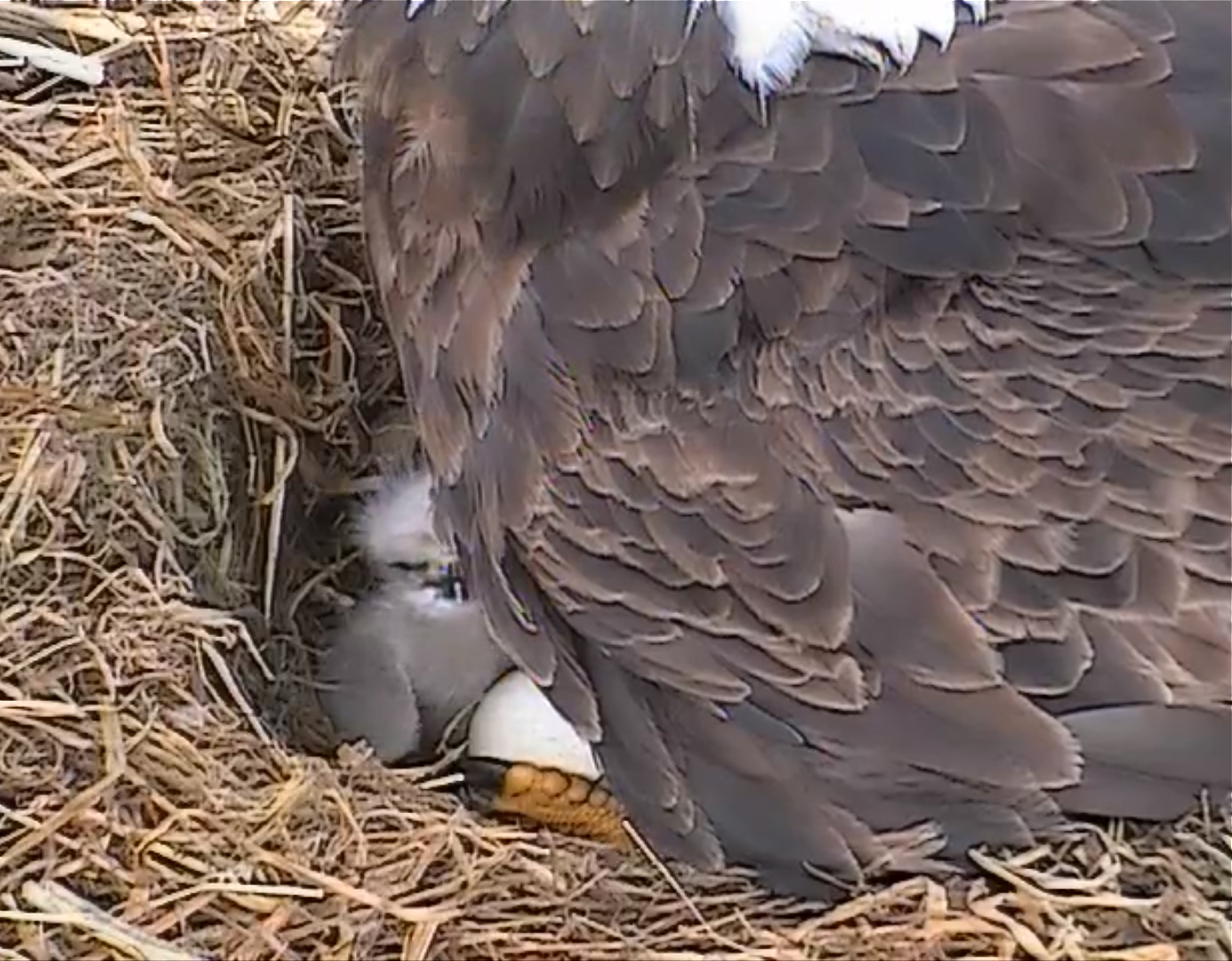
"D18", first eaglet born in 2014, peeps out from behind "Mom"; D18 was the 18th of the Decorah parents' offspring.

The Decorah Bald Eagles (also known as Decorah Eagles or variations) is a website featuring a live-streaming webcam trained on a bald eagle nest and family in Decorah, Iowa. The Raptor Resource Project installed and runs the live stream for research purposes. It is one of dozens of eagle webcams across the United States.

Filmed in real time, the parents can be seen delivering a variety of freshly caught prey, feeding the eaglets, and protecting them from predators and harsh weather. With the help of infrared lighting, the nest is viewable around the clock during the nesting season, which typically begins in January or February, with fledge in June.

The Decorah Eagles became an Internet phenomenon and the most viewed live-stream of all time when the website reached 250 million views on Ustream in 2011, with roughly 2.4 million views per day. Ustream began hosting the video feed in 2011, although the live-cam was initiated in 2007, and was used to provide footage for the PBS Nature documentary "American Eagle'" released in 2008. In May 2020 the eagles were featured in NOVA's documentary "Eagle Power".

Viewers missed the 2013 season after the eagle couple built and moved to an alternate nest ("N2"). Cameras were installed in the new nest and caught the 2014 and 2015 filming seasons, when the couple selected it again.

== Background ==
=== American Eagle ===
PBS's Nature series released a documentary featuring the now famous eagle family in 2008 called American Eagle. The hour-long piece includes the death of the male's first mate, who disappeared during a snowstorm, and the subsequent courtship, nest-building and mating with "Mom", his mate since the winter of 2007.

=== Website ===
The live webcam was set up in 2007 by the Raptor Resource Project (RRP), Xcel Energy and Dairyland Power, and was upgraded to live-streaming by Ustream in 2011. The Decorah Eagles' Ustream channel features in real time the Decorah, Iowa bald eagle family as they build and repair their nests, mate and lay eggs, struggle with bad weather and predators, and protect and care for their young. The parents take turns incubating the eggs. Over 280 million people have observed the progress of the eagle family from eggs to fledgling birds.

== Identifying the eagles ==
To learn more or to watch the eagles live, visit https://www.raptorresource.org/birdcams/decorah-eagles/.

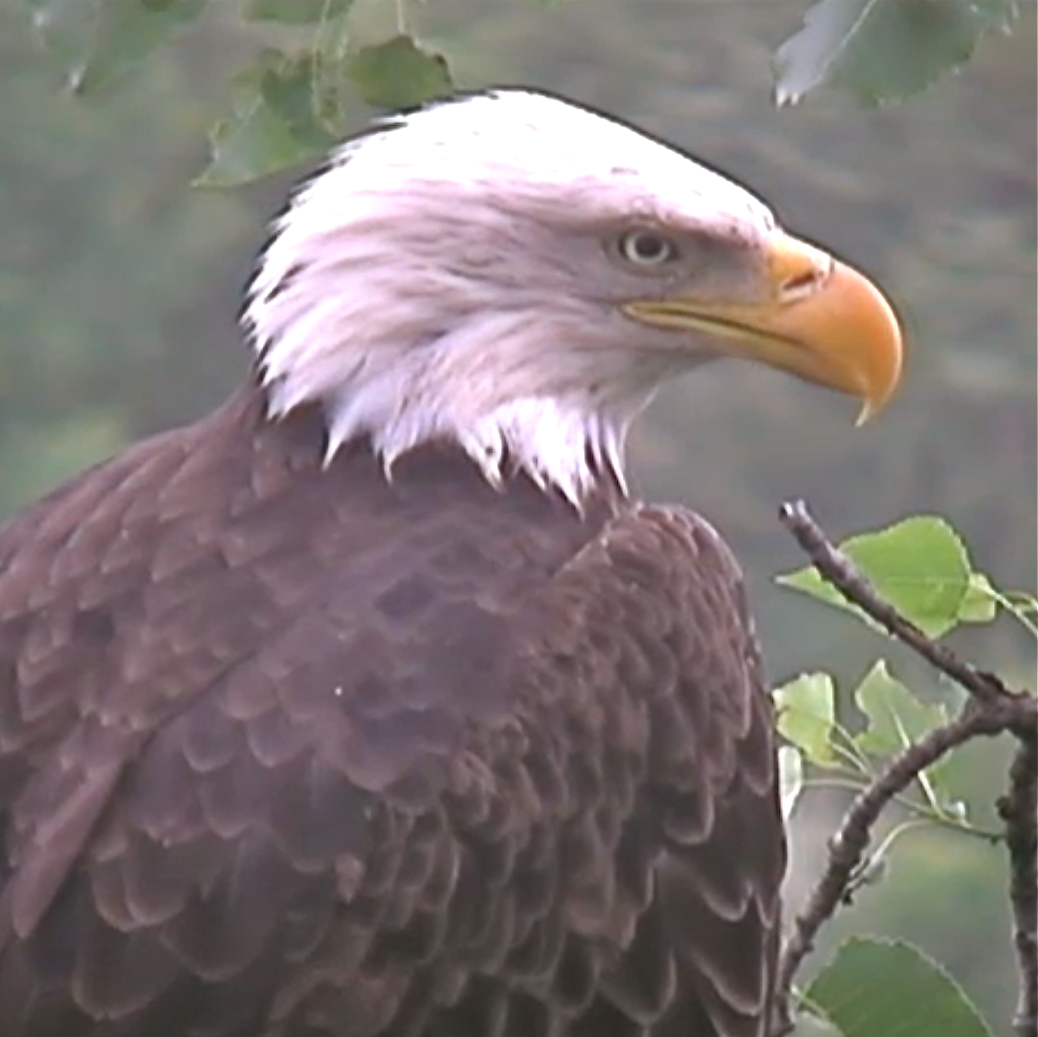
Mom, August 2011

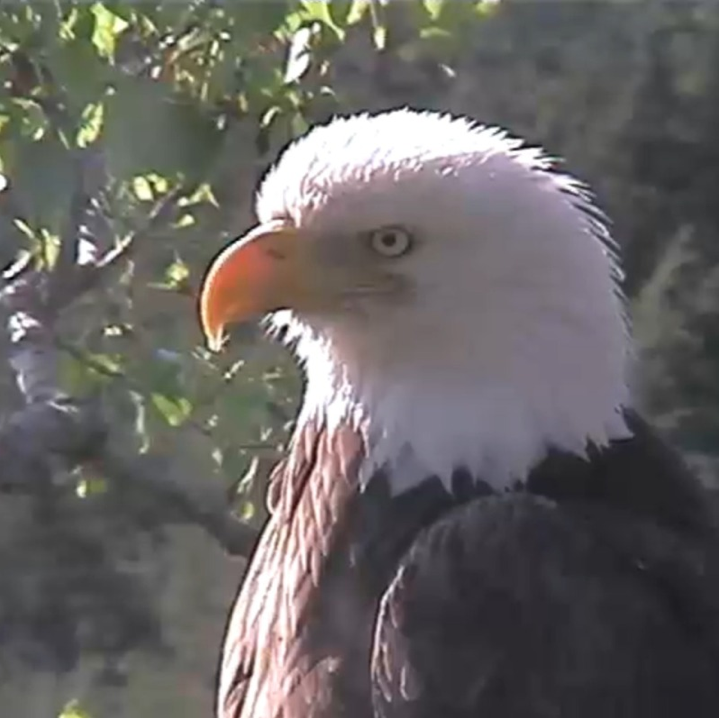
Dad, August 2011

The Decorah Eagles are not given names in order to prevent viewers from regarding them as pets. According to the Raptor Resource Project, "traditional names can create an undue tendency to anthropomorphize. While the human emotion that may be attached to the eaglets is understandable, an alpha-numeric system for referencing them may help us distance ourselves to observe the wonder of wildlife and nature at work". In 2011 the eaglets were simply called E1, E2 and E3. After the 2011 season, a new system was designed as a way to keep track of the couple's entire progeny. The eaglets are now designated by serial numbers: D (for their region, Decorah) and a number based on the order they are born, beginning with the couple's first hatch. Thus, the 2012 clutch became known as D12, D13 and D14.

The parents were known as M and D, for "Mom" and "Dad". The adult plumage (white feathers covering head, neck and tail) develops when bald eagles are sexually mature, between 4 and 5 years of age. The species is placed in the genus Haliaeetus (sea eagles) which gets both its common and scientific names from the distinctive appearance of the adult's head. Bald in the English name is derived from the word piebald, meaning "white headed".

The Decorah Mom was younger than Dad, and is easily differentiated by her "eyeshadow" and darker feathers interspersed with the white ones on her head and tail. Dad has a fully white head and tail and is noticeably smaller than Mom; male bald eagles are normally 25% smaller than females.

Dad Decorah disappeared on April 18, 2018 following severe snow storms. Mom Decorah raised her three eaglets alone and received the attentions of at least three eagle males through that spring and summer. She chose a male eagle named by RRP as DM2 (Decorah Male 2) as her mate. Mom Decorah and DM2 raised eaglets in the 2018–2019 season. DM2 has returned for the 2019–2020 season.

== Nests ==
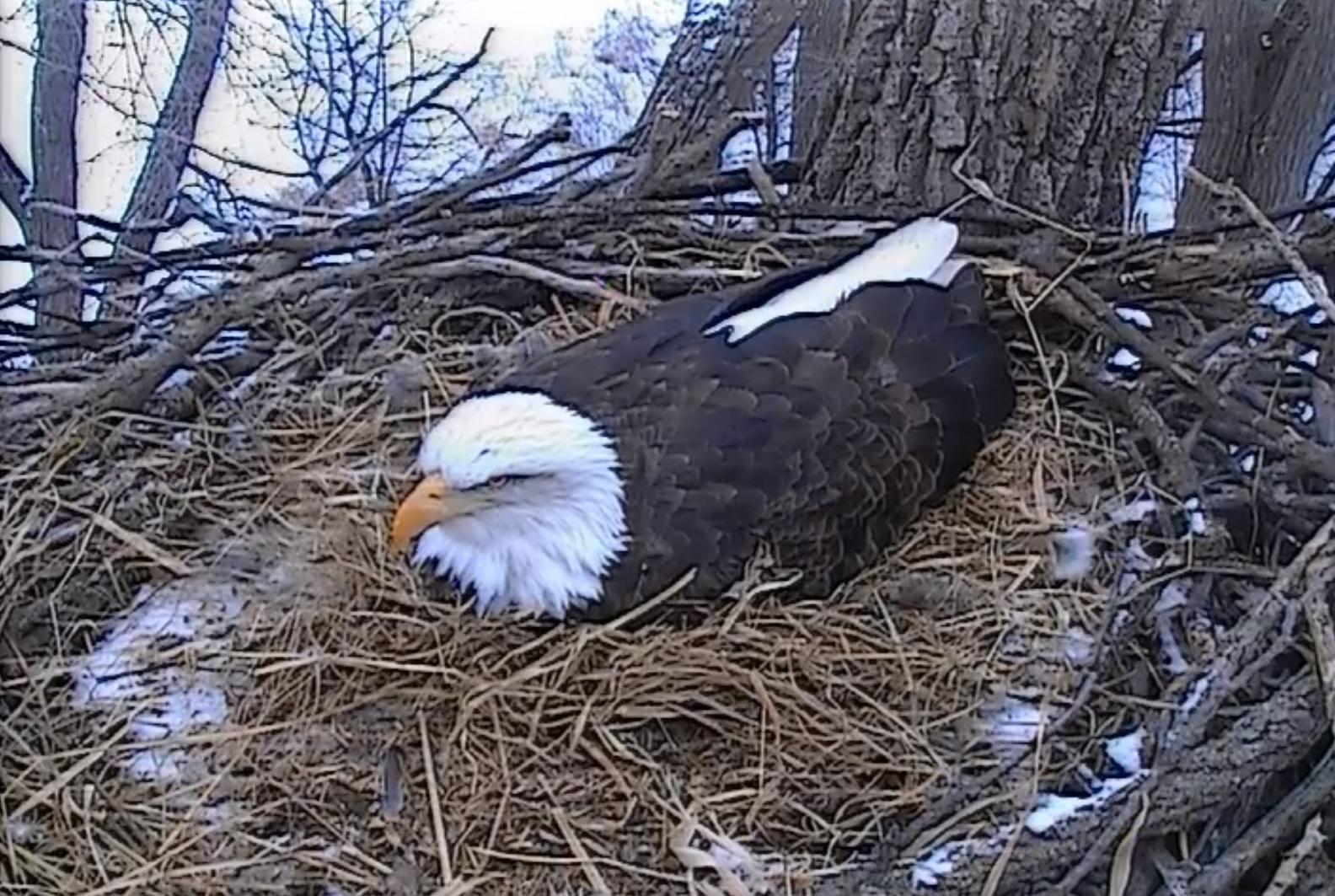
Mom sits in N2 keeping her first egg warm in dangerously frigid temperatures; February 24, 2014.

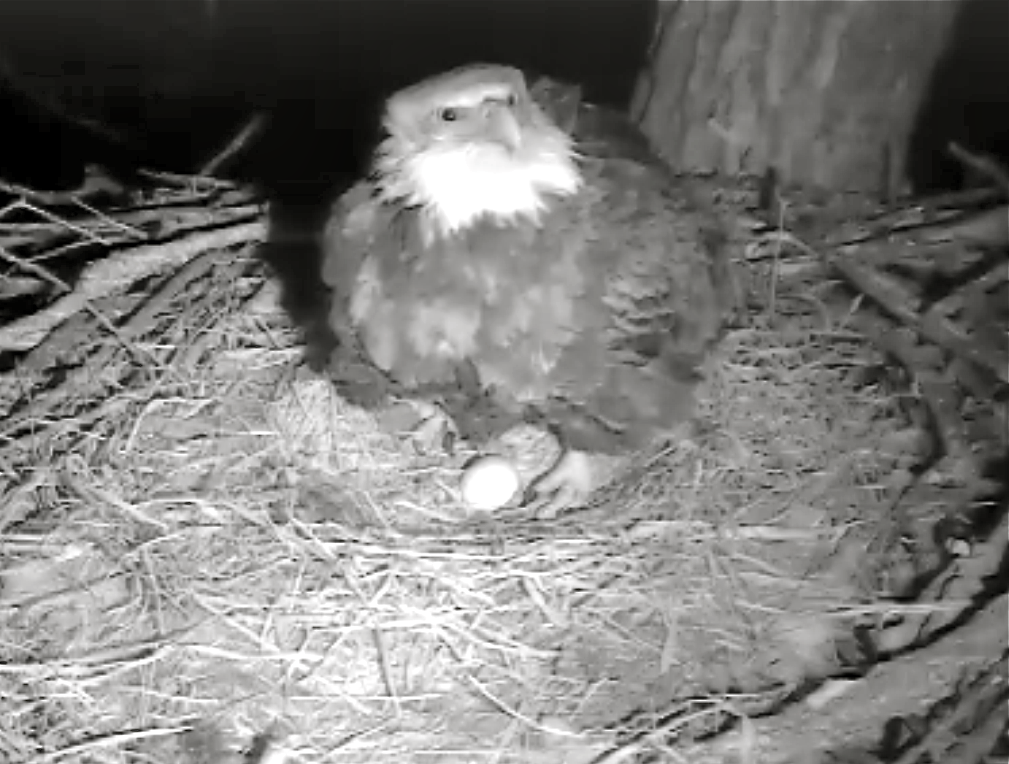
Infrared lighting shows N2's deep 'nest bowl' and D18, the first of three eggs laid in 2014.

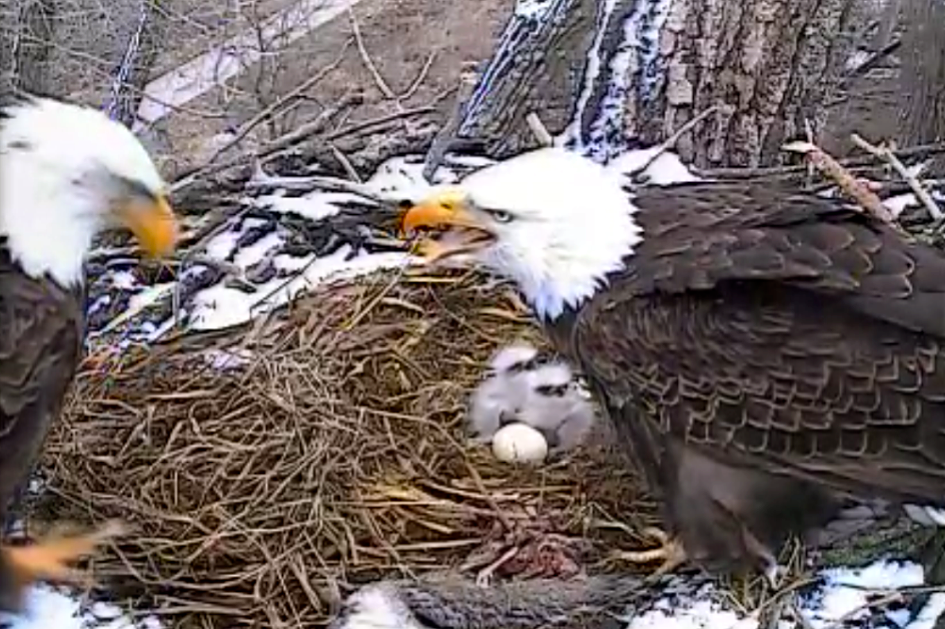
Mom and Dad in N2 with two newly hatched eaglets and an unhatched egg; April 4, 2014

Three nests are in use by the couple. They sit atop cottonwood trees standing about 400 feet apart overlooking a fresh stream, next to a trout farm. The original nest (N1), used by the couple from 2007 to 2012, is estimated to measure 6.5 feet in diameter, with a radius of 3.25 feet.

=== N2 ===
In the fall of 2012, the Decorah parents built an 'alternate nest', referred to as "N2", 400 feet away from N1. While 45 percent of all bald eagle couples build multiple nests, it was a first for the Decorah pair. The Raptor Resource Project waited until the 2013 clutch was "on the wing" before installing live-streaming cameras above the new nest, so there was no filming of the 2013 season. N2 was fitted with cameras, microphones and cables, including "a remotely operated pan-tilt-zoom camera [and] a fixed infra-red cam for night viewing" at a cost of more than $17,000. The couple chose N2 in 2014 and 2015.

=== N2B ===
On July 18, 2015 the N2 nest tree was destroyed by a storm. The eaglets had fledged for the year. RRP chose to try to build a new nest close by (N2B), which the eagles did adopt and have been using since 2015.

== Tracking the eagles ==
To aid in the study of bald eagles, a satellite transmitter was attached to a juvenile from both the 2011 and 2012 clutches. According to Bob Anderson, the GPS caused a bit of controversy as fans of the site found it invasive. Anderson said that after people started to see D1's travels and it became clear that she was not negatively affected, they agreed with Anderson that the transmitter project was beneficial. Anderson explained the purpose of the program:

The parents don't migrate. They stay here year round. But do the babies migrate? We don't know. We're going to find out ... We're actually going to learn a little bit of science here and we're excited about that... with GPS coordinates we'll learn where these babies roam until they reach adulthood and eventually establish their own nest site.

After the birds had been on the wing for a few weeks, RRP worked with an experienced eagle biologist to trap and fit them with a transmitter. The biologist is running a larger scale study with bald eagles, so the birds have become part of that. The transmitter is a backpack-style solar powered transmitter from Northstar Science and Technology. The transmitter is very lightweight, and because the eagles had been on wing for a few weeks, their flight muscles were fully developed, so the harness was able to be fitted properly. A satellite in a polar orbit 'pings' the transmitter several times a day, providing RRP with a latitude/longitude coordinate set that gives researchers the eagle's location within a few hundred feet. The satellite turns on at 10:00 CST each morning.

=== D1 ===
Raptor Resource Project hosts a map tracking the whereabouts of D1, a female, the second born in 2011. D1 was the tenth eaglet born to the Decorah couple, but was named before the newer identification system was created.

D1 impressed Anderson with her attraction to rivers, her ability to make long flights, and her adventurous spirit. She was expected to follow the Mississippi River and stay near Iowa or Illinois, but instead went on a 1,000 mile trek to northern Wisconsin and Minnesota before returning to her natal area in January 2012. She surprised researchers by making a 140-mile trip in a single day. D1 flew to an area "closer to Greenland than to Iowa", Anderson noted. After her trip back to Decorah, D1 headed for Polar Bear Provincial Park, some 1,000 miles north of Iowa near the Arctic, on the shores of Hudson Bay in Ontario, Canada.

In December 2012, D1 returned for the second time to Decorah. She had spent the summer above the Arctic Circle, again in Polar Bear Provincial Park. Bob Anderson was able to track and photograph her, and said that when he tried to get in close, she flew away. "This is good. She has a fear of people that can only help her in life."

By 2014, she had logged more than 2,000 miles after making two trips to Hudson Bay.

=== D14, D18 and FOUR ===
D14, from the 2012 clutch, lived only a few months and never traveled far from Decorah. The second Decorah juvenile to be fitted with a transmitter was found at the base of a utility pole, electrocuted, in late November 2012. A sibling, D12, suffered the same fate only months earlier in July 2012.

A third eaglet, D18, from the 2014 clutch, met a similar fate on July 8, 2014 when it attempted to land on a high voltage transmission wire near Decorah and was electrocuted. "FOUR", the single remaining bird from the 2014 Decorah alumni to remain in the wild, was electrocuted. This was the fourth Decorah juvenile known to have died from electrocution.

== Popularity ==
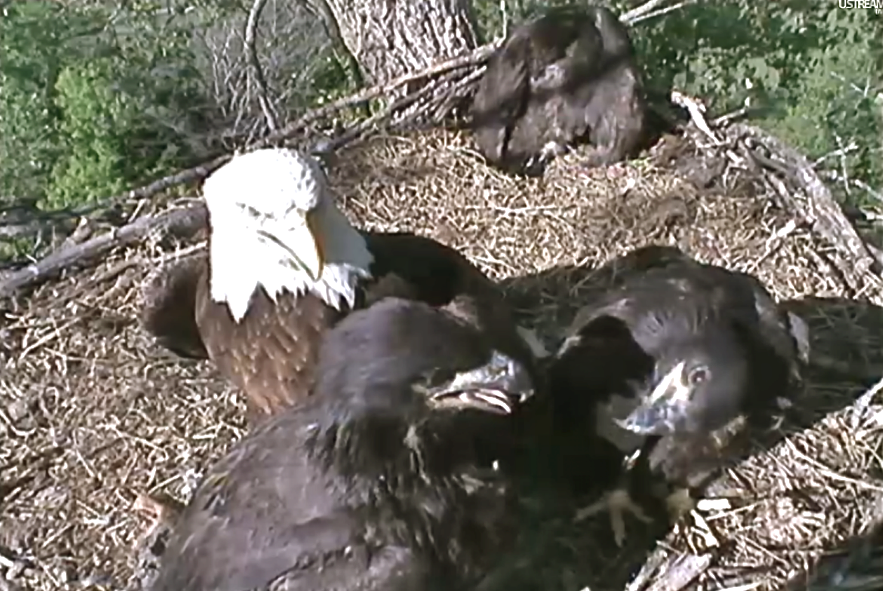
Playing in the nest, May 2012

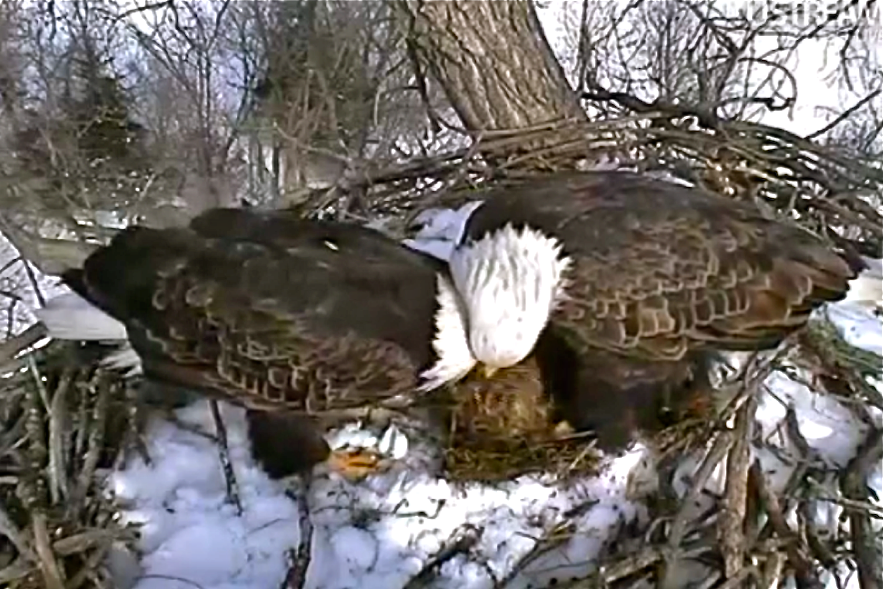
Mating behavior (Dad on left, Mom on right), December 2011

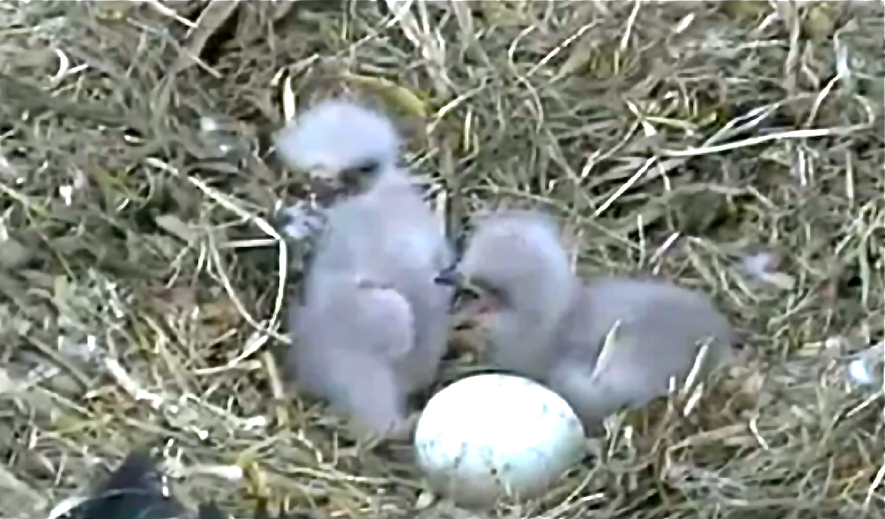
Decorah eaglets, 2011

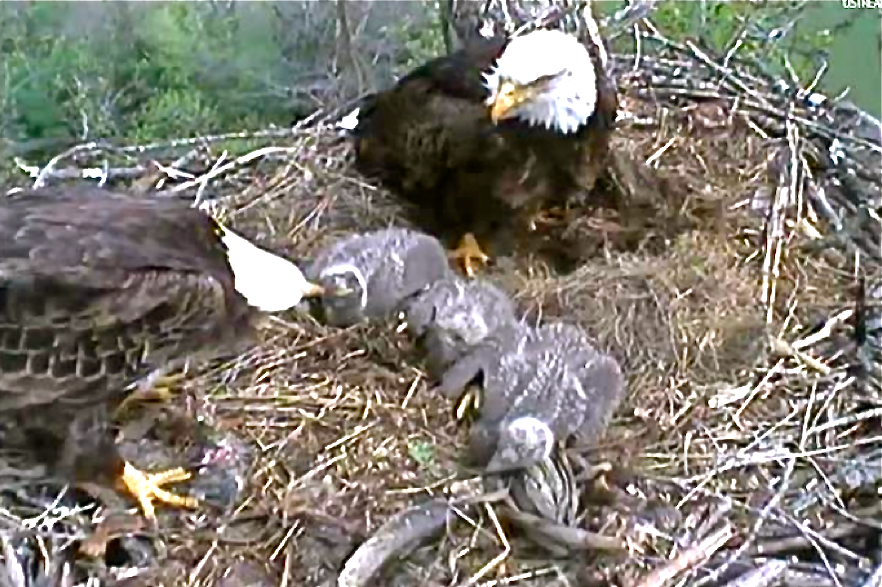
Decorah Dad feeding eaglet, April 2012

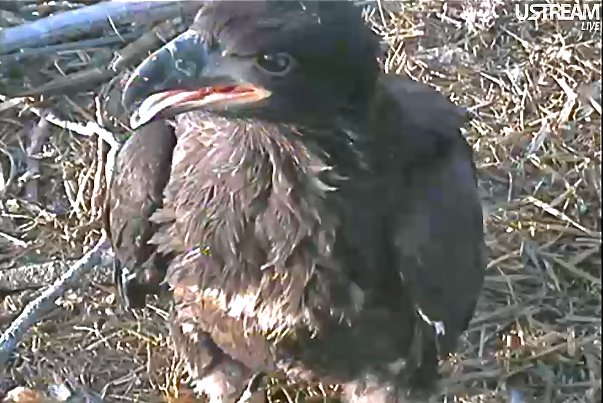
Decorah juvenile in nest, May 2012

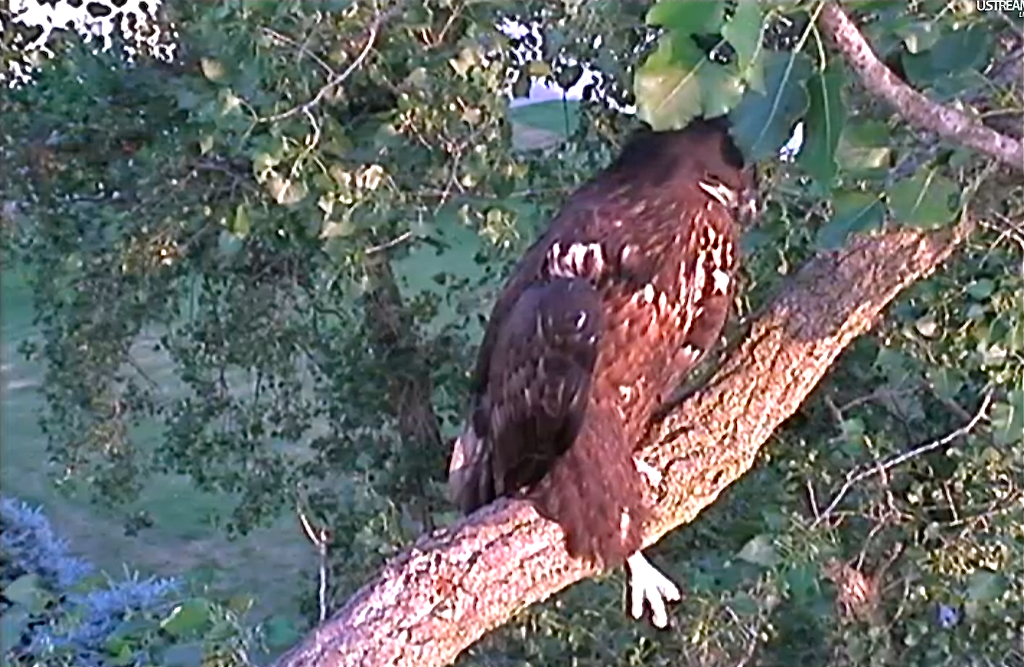
Decorah juvenile "branching", July 2012

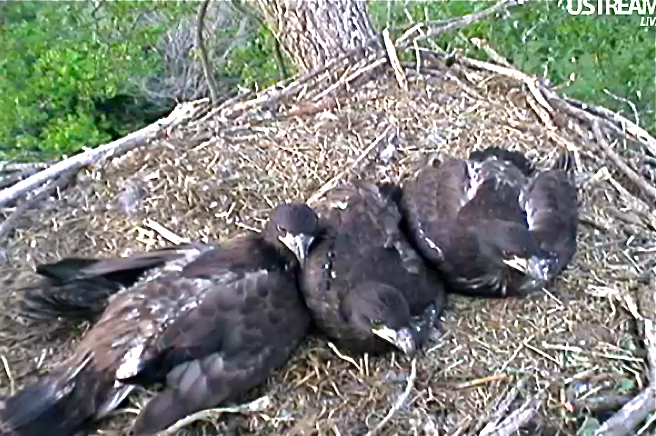
Decorah juveniles, May 2012

In 2011 links to the website went viral, and by the end of the first season it had reached over 200 million people from 184 countries. The eagles have been featured in a wide array of media outlets ranging from tech and pop culture to animal-related websites and news outlets.

The eagles were mentioned on the syndicated game show Jeopardy! in May 2012 with the statement, "'In April 2011, thousands tuned in to watch these baby birds'".

Fans of the eagles were at the Decorah Fish Hatchery to watch from a distance as the parents care for their babies.

Bob Anderson, executive director of the Raptor Resource Project, was interviewed on NPR's All Things Considered and shared his thoughts on the cam's popularity:

"This is a positive....everybody, when they log on they go 'wow'. It's just good to have something positive to watch with so much bad news in the world".

The Decorah Newspapers printed:

The bald eagle reality show revealed survival in the harshest weather, love and nurturing from the devoted parents, pecking order squabbles soon forgotten as sibling bonds were forged and multiple lessons in trust, patience and perseverance as the little bandit-masked, bobble-headed hatchlings evolved into beautiful juvenile raptors with distinct personalities and all the skill sets needed to venture out into the wild on their own.

The Decorah Eagles' story was also closely followed by Wired Science. One article about the eagles became their most popular post in 2011. Wired referred to the eagle cam as 2011's "runaway Internet sensation" and noted that they had created their own "online community of eaglophiles". According to Wired, "so many people tuned in, the traffic crashed Wired.com more than once".

According to Forbes, "this no-frills nature video has drawn crazy traffic of the sort that would make Justin Bieber [sic] and Beyoncé jealous". TechCrunch TV called the Decorah Eagles the web's "biggest reality TV stars" in 2011 and explained their online popularity from a technical standpoint:

Part of what made the Decorah Eagles feed so popular was that it was so bare bones, just a profile page, and a live stream of a family of eagles doing what they do. But, with the rise of user generated content distribution media (and their popularity), social tools have the power to make the content much more engaging and interactive for viewers.

The feed didn't include any bells and whistles to reach a broad audience, but Ustream has added a few features this year to improve upon the Decorah Eagles sitcom experience, including, for starters, night vision, high definition, and panning cameras. The company is also incorporating a "Social Stream" feature, where fans can communicate in a realtime, using an interactive chat module to share their thoughts and cheer on the eagles, as the video streams. (This also includes Facebook and Twitter integration.)

TechCrunch TV head Jon Orlin is a fan of the site. On the phenomenon of the Decorah Eagles' Ustream channel, he said:

"It's pretty amazing how this live eagle channel has taken off. There are no (human) actors, writers, or fancy production or graphics. Just mother nature. Actually, it does take some impressive bird cameras and technology infrastructure. Much of the time, there isn't a lot of action happening. But it's live, compelling, and you don't want to miss what happens next. If it weren't available live, it just wouldn't have the same impact, or, likely the sizable viewership".

== In the news ==
On July 1, 2012, one day after the live cam had shut down for the season, the oldest of the season's three eaglets (D12) was found dead at the foot of a utility pole near the nest. D12 hatched on March 27, branched on June 9 and had fledged on June 13. Authorities believe the cause of death was electrocution. After Raptor Resource Project leaders notified the power company, crews showed up to address the safety concerns by installing a temporary insulation shield on the poles in the area. While power lines are not an electrocution hazard for birds, older poles that are unshielded can be dangerous.

D12's remains were turned over to the Fish and Wildlife Service, in accordance with the Eagle feather law. Because the bald eagle is a sacred bird in some North American cultures, D12's feathers are being distributed to qualified Native Americans for use in religious ceremonies through the National Eagle Repository.

From Raptor Resource Project: We are sorry to announce that Four, the single remaining bird from the 2014 Decorah alumni to remain in the wild, was electrocuted on Tuesday, March 2, 2015. This is the fourth eaglet from Decorah that we know of to die from electrocution. Bob and a good friend picked her carcass up on Thursday after the Eagle Valley team notified us that they received a mortality ping. Bob and Brett examined her on Saturday and verified the cause of death.

== Fundraising efforts ==
The Raptor Resource Project has partnered with artists to raise funds for the eagle cam by selling their photography and books (Frozen Eagles, The EEeee's & Me, The Decorah Bald Eagles and Three Little Eagles and How They Grew: Jacob's Story), as well as apparel, mouse-pads, mugs and artwork.

== See also ==
- Brooklyn Bunny
- Eagles4kids
- Jackie and Shadow
- Southwest Florida Eagle Cam
- List of individual birds
