= AEG Dr.I =

Dr.I
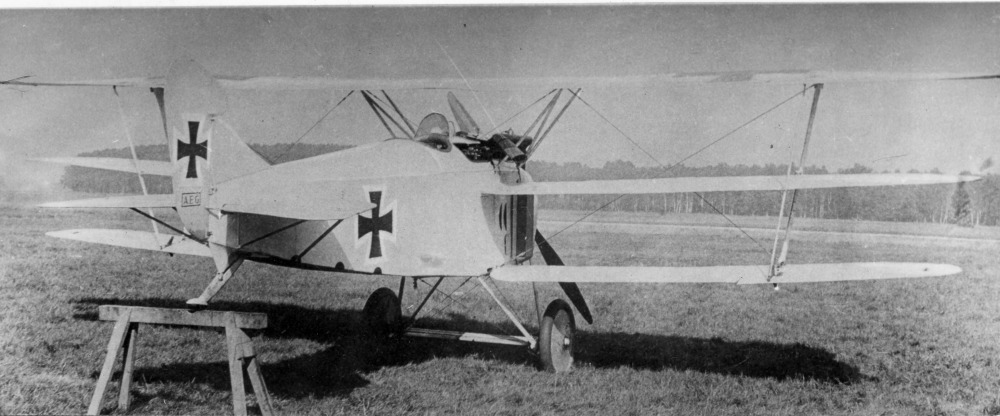

General information
- Type: Fighter aircraft
- Manufacturer: AEG
- Number built: 1

History
- Developed from: AEG D.I

The AEG Dr.I was a prototype triplane fighter built by the Allgemeine Elektricitäts-Gesellschaft (AEG) during the First World War for the Imperial German Army's (Deutsches Heer) Imperial German Air Service (Luftstreitkräfte) in 1917. It was derived from the D.I biplane. Only a single prototype was built and it was not chosen for production.

== Development ==
German fighter pilots had been extremely impressed by the British Sopwith Triplane in early 1917 and the Inspectorate of Flying Troops (Inspektion der Fliegertruppen (Idflieg) responded by ordering triplanes from almost all of the German aircraft manufacturers in July after one had been captured intact. AEG modified the design of a D.I biplane with new wings and completed one prototype in October. Other than the triple wing it was a D.I, the aircraft had the same fuselage, engine and twin gun armament of its earlier brethren.

== Specifications (AEG Dr.I) ==
Data from German Aircraft of the First World War; A.E.G. Aircraft of WWI: A Centennial Perspective on Great War Airplanes

General characteristics

- Crew: 1
- Length: 6.15 m (20 ft 2 in)
- Upper wingspan: 9.4 m (30 ft 10 in)
- Mid wingspan: 9.1 m (29 ft 10 in)
- Lower wingspan: 8.8 m (28 ft 10 in)
- Wing area: 24 m^{2} (260 sq ft)
- Empty weight: 710 kg (1,565 lb)
- Gross weight: 970 kg (2,138 lb)
- Powerplant: 1 × Mercedes D.IIIa water-cooled straight-six piston engine, 120 kW (160 hp)
- Propellers: 2-bladed

Performance

- Maximum speed: 200 km/h (120 mph, 110 kn)
- Time to altitude: 2.5 minutes to 1,000 m (3,300 ft)

Armament

- Guns: 2 × forward-firing 7.92 mm (.312 in) LMG 08/15 machine guns

== See also ==
Related development

- AEG D.I

Related lists

- List of military aircraft of Germany
- List of fighter aircraft

== Bibliography ==
- Gray, Peter & Thetford, Owen (1987) [1970]. German Aircraft of the First World War (2nd ed.). London: Putnam. ISBN 0-85177-809-7.
- Green, William & Swanborough, Gordon (2001) [1994]. The Complete Book of Fighters: An Illustrated Encyclopedia of Every Fighter Built and Flown (Revised and Updated ed.). London: Salamander Books. ISBN 1-84065-269-1.
- Herris, Jack (2015). A.E.G. Aircraft of WWI: A Centennial Perspective on Great War Airplanes. Great War Aviation Centennial Series. Vol. 16. n. p.: Aeronaut Books. ISBN 978-1-935881-28-5.
