= Brooklyn Bunny =

Internet animal webcam

- Industry: Internet & Pet
- Founded: August 28, 2005
- Headquarters: Brooklyn, New York
- Key people: Kevin Dresser & Kate Johnson
- Website: www.bklynbunny.com

The Brooklyn Bunny website is one of the first and currently the longest running rabbit webcams.

== History ==
The Brooklyn Bunny website is a rabbit webcam that first went live on August 28, 2005. The website is a project of designers Kevin Dresser and Kate Johnson of the design firm Dresser Johnson. The idea was initiated when the two Brooklyn-based designers discussed starting a rabbit pet-sitting business. The idea was to have two live webcams so rabbit owners could check in on their rabbit via the internet. However, the pet-sitting business was scrapped when they offered to care for a foster rabbit. The idea of the Brooklyn Bunny website was born when they became attached to the Dwarf Hotot rabbit, which they decided to name Roebling after John A. Roebling, designer of the Brooklyn Bridge.

== Roebling ==
Roebling is the name of the rabbit star of Brooklyn Bunny. He is named after the designer of the Brooklyn Bridge, John A. Roebling. Roebling is a Dwarf Hotot breed of rabbit.
