= Identification tag =

Identification tag may refer to:

- Dog tag, an identification tag used by the military
- Microchip implant (animal) or radio identification tag, a scanner-readable microchip implanted into livestock and pets for identification
- Pet tag, a small flat tag worn on pets' collars or harnesses
- Toe tag, identification tag used on the big toe of a dead person in a morgue
- Personal badge
