= Ideas and Discoveries =

US magazine

- Editor: Doner, Brooks, Rich, Papazian
- Categories: Science
- Frequency: Bi-monthly
- Publisher: Heinrich Bauer Publishing, L.P.
- First issue: 10 December 2010
- Company: Bauer Media Group
- Country: United States
- Based in: Englewood Cliffs, New Jersey
- Language: English
- Website: www.ideasanddiscoveries.com
- ISSN: 2161-2641

Ideas and Discoveries or i.D. is a magazine covering science, with a heavy interest in social science. The magazine was first published on 10 December 2010. It is an American magazine available in newsstands, published on a bi-monthly basis. It is part of the Bauer Media Group. This magazine is modeled after the German magazine Welt der Wunder. It is a relatively new magazine, with limited content exposure from its website.
