= Interlink Airlines =

Airline based in Johannesburg, South Africa

IATA	ICAO	Call sign
ID (IATA later Transferred to Batik Air)	ITK	INTERLINK
- Founded: 1998
- Ceased operations: 2010
- Operating bases: OR Tambo International Airport
- Fleet size: 6 (in 2007)
- Destinations: 7 (in 2009)
- Headquarters: Johannesburg, South Africa
- Key people: Murad Ismail; Maraldiya Cader (2001-2010 fact)
- Website: www.flyinterlink.co.za

Interlink Airlines Pty Ltd. was an airline based in Johannesburg, South Africa, operating scheduled and chartered flights (including medical rescue, and VIP transport services) out of OR Tambo International Airport. Its IATA code has since been reassigned to Batik Air.

== History ==
Interlink Airlines was founded in 1998. After long-lasting financial troubles, the airline had to suspend all of its flights on 22 February 2010, and went into liquidation on 2 March.

== Destinations ==
In October 2009, Interlink Airlines operated scheduled services to the following destinations:

- Burundi
  - Bujumbura - Bujumbura International Airport
- Saudi Arabia
  - Jeddah - King Abdulaziz International Airport
- South Africa
  - Cape Town - Cape Town International Airport
  - Durban - King Shaka International Airport
  - Johannesburg - OR Tambo International Airport base
  - Kruger National Park - Kruger Mpumalanga International Airport
  - Pretoria - Wonderboom Airport

== Fleet ==
At its height, Interlink operated a fleet of four Boeing 737-200 aircraft (equipped with 106 passenger seats, 18 of which were in business class), the first of which had been acquired in October 2005. By late 2009, all but one had been withdrawn from service. Additionally, between 2006 and 2007, the airline was in possession of three smaller Embraer EMB 120 Brasilia aircraft and one McDonnell Douglas DC-9-30 from 2003 until 2005.
