= Ladder diagram =

Ladder diagram may refer to:

- Message sequence chart, in Unified Modeling Language (UML)
- Ladder logic, a method of drawing electrical logic schematics. A ladder diagram represents a program in ladder logic.
- A method of juggling notation
- One type of Feynman diagram
