= Personal identity number =

Personal identity number may refer to:

- National identification number, used by national authorities.
- Personal identification number, or PIN, used for identification for credit card usage and other situations.
