= Knoller D.I =

1910s Austria-Hungary prototype aircraft

D.I

General information
- Type: Fighter
- National origin: Austria-Hungary
- Manufacturer: Knoller
- Designer: Richard Knoller
- Primary user: Kaiserliche und Königliche Luftfahrtruppen (KuKLFT)
- Number built: 2

History
- First flight: 23 November 1917

The Knoller D.I series 70 was a prototype fighter aircraft built in the Austro-Hungarian Empire during World War I for use by the Kaiserliche und Königliche Luftfahrtruppen (KuKLFT).

== Variants ==
70.01
first prototype
70.02
second prototype
D.I
planned production version (10 ordered, none built)

== Specifications (70.01) ==
Data from

General characteristics

- Crew: 1
- Length: 6.35 m (20 ft 10 in)
- Wingspan: 8.02 m (26 ft 4 in)
- Height: 2.85 m (9 ft 4 in)
- Wing area: 22 m^{2} (240 sq ft)
- Empty weight: 646 kg (1,424 lb)
- Gross weight: 940 kg (2,072 lb)
- Powerplant: 1 × Hiero 6 cylinder water-cooled in-line piston engine, 170 kW (230 hp)
- Propellers: 2-bladed fixed-pitch propeller

Performance

- Maximum speed: 240 km/h (150 mph, 130 kn)
- Cruise speed: 205 km/h (127 mph, 111 kn)
- Endurance: 2 hours 30 minutes
- Service ceiling: 7,550 m (24,770 ft)
- Time to altitude: 1,000 m (3,300 ft) in 4 minutes 24 seconds

Armament

- Guns: 2 × synchronized 8 mm (0.315 in) Schwarzlose MG-16 machine guns

== Bibliography ==
- Green, William & Swanborough, Gordon (2001) [1994]. The Complete Book of Fighters: An Illustrated Encyclopedia of Every Fighter Built and Flown (Revised and Updated ed.). London: Salamander Books. ISBN 1-84065-269-1.
- Grosz, Peter Michael; Haddow, George & Schiemer, Peter (1993). Austro-Hungarian Army Aircraft of World War One. Mountain View, California: Flying Machines Press. ISBN 0-9637110-0-8.
