= Id (comics) =

South Korean comic series

^이드
- Genre: Action/adventureComic fantasy, martial arts, romantic comedy, romantic fantasy
- Author: Kim Daewoo
- Illustrator: A. T. Kenny
- Publisher: Book Box
- Original run: 2001
- Volumes: 29

Id - The Greatest Fusion Fantasy is a manhwa (comic) written by Kim Daewoo (김대우), with art by A. T. Kenny. Released between 2001 and 2009, the manhwa version is adapted from the web novel of the same name written by Kim Daewoo. The plot is set in a fantasy universe where traditional sword and sorcery elements (mana, elemental magic system, dragons, elves, dwarves etc.) and Chinese wuxia plot elements (qi, taoist ideas, references to jianghu) coexist.

== Release history and popularity ==
The manhwa was originally posted on a Korean web fantasy novel website, and spread to other then South Korean online service providers such as hitel, nownuri and Chollian from 2001.

== Plot summary ==
This is the story of a man named Ye Chun Hwa (예천화) who is trapped in a world he does not come from. He soon takes the name of Id in order to not attract attention with his unusual name. As Chun Hwa progresses through this strange new world he makes friends, enemies, and part of his past is shown indicating that there is more than meets the eye. Around volume six his origins and his past are revealed, but many questions about him remain unanswered.

== Characters ==
=== Id Characters ===
- Ye Chun Hwa (예천화)/ Id (이드) - Id is a human man with a feminine appearance who comes from a place called Middle Kingdom.
- Lamia (라미아) - Lamia is the ancient sword created by Greydrone, the dragon, and the Gods. She chose Id as her master.
- Irlina (일리나) - A female high elf.
- Grey (그레이) - A human warrior with great physical strength who functions as the comic relief among the party.
- Reindelph (라인델프) - An old dwarf who travels with the party.
- Hael (하엘) - A human female priestess who is Grey's childhood friend.
- Ilran (일란) - A human mage who appears to be in his thirties. As the series progresses, he is drawn to be younger than he initially was.

=== Dragons ===
- Greydrone (그래이드론) - The former Dragon Lord who created the sword, Lamia, but was unable to use it.
- Laillo Sidgar (라일로 시드가) - The golden dragon Id and his party went to seek.
- Selenia (세레니아) - She is the current Dragon Lord and is considered the most powerful dragon in the world.

=== Others ===
- Locklon - Locklin's brother who finds and saves Irlina after the battle with Perser. He is regularly mistaken for Locklin.
- Great Sage Lauri - Ilran's idol and a mage of great skill.
- Launian - Son of the great sage Lauri, a seemingly arrogant youth.
- Dark Mage Cleon - First appeared during the magic tournament competition as a competitor.

=== Fragments of Chaos ===
- Chaos - leader of the group.
- Percer - A dual-wielding sword fighter.
- Canta - A spell caster able to do instant spells of the highest ranking. He takes the form of a teddy bear, and is carried around by Morkana.
- Mercio - Lycanthrope that has many human characteristics, but is not human himself.
- Kukudo - A high-level warrior that uses a hammer to fight.
- Ashirijen - A woman who uses forcefields, manipulates wind, and moves at hypersonic speed.
