= AEG D.I =

Type of aircraft

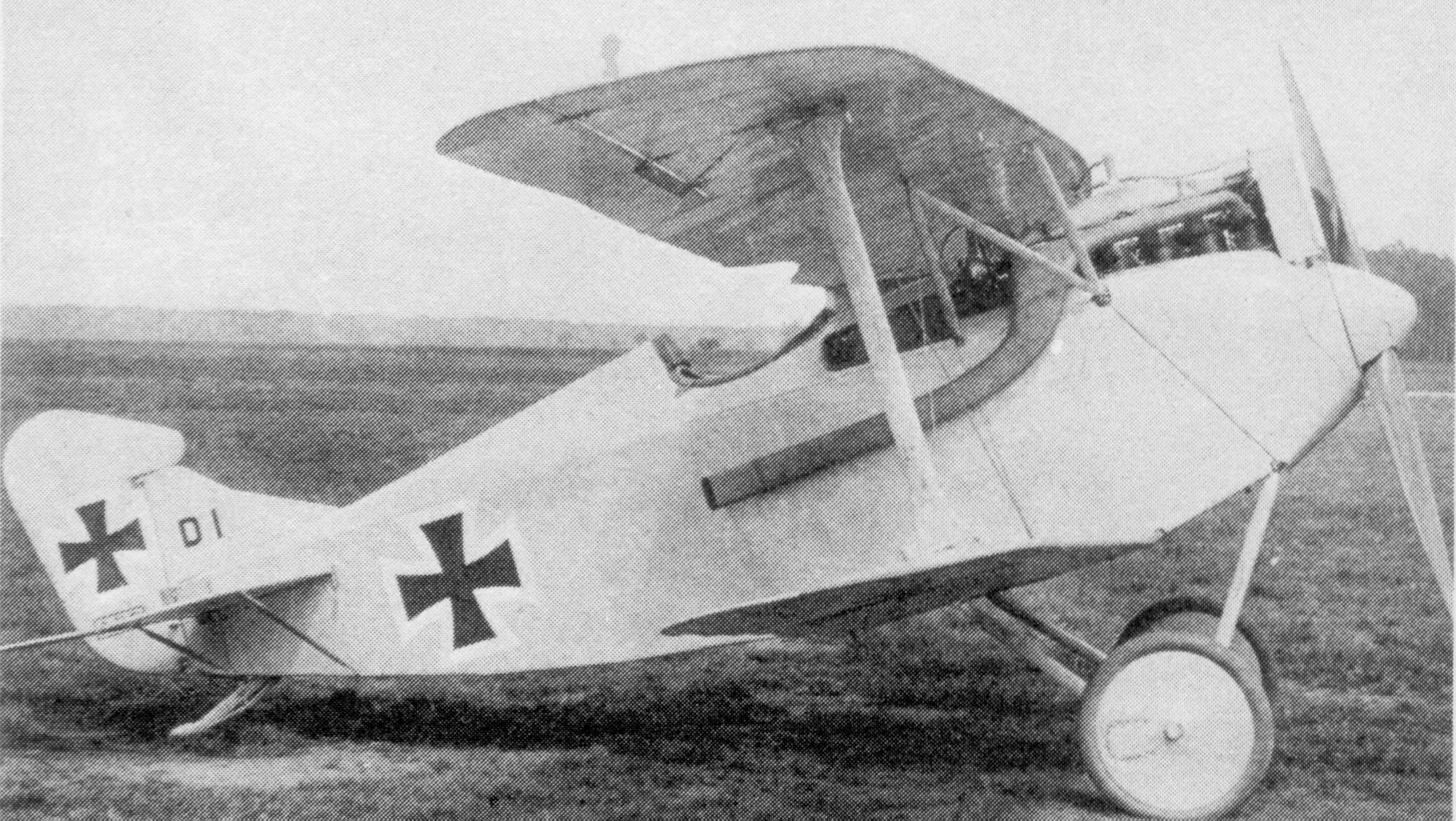
- The first prototype of the D.I fighter

General information
- Type: Fighter aircraft
- National origin: German Empire
- Manufacturer: AEG
- Number built: 3+

History
- First flight: May 1917
- Variants: AEG Dr.I

The AEG D.I was a prototype biplane fighter built by the Allgemeine Elektricitäts-Gesellschaft (AEG) during the First World War for the Imperial German Army's (Deutsches Heer) Imperial German Air Service (Luftstreitkräfte). Three prototypes were ordered in 1917, but after the first two were involved in fatal crashes, development was cancelled. A triplane version was built as the Dr.I.

== Development ==
AEG designed the prototype single-seat D.I fighter in early 1917. It used the company's typical steel tubing for the fuselage, but the single-bay wings also used a single spar built from steel tubing. The ribs were initially made from wood, but they were later changed to steel. The additional strength that the steel tubing added to the wings allowed AEG to minimize the number of drag-inducing wire braces and reduced the number of interplane struts to a single I-strut per side. The D.I was powered by a water-cooled 160-horsepower (120 kW) Mercedes D.III straight-six piston engine that used a nose-mounted radiator. It was armed with a pair of forward-firing 7.92-millimeter (0.312 in) LMG 08/15 machine guns.

The first prototype was completed in May 1917. Flight testing revealed a maximum speed of 225 kilometres per hour (140 mph) and a climb rate that matched that of the Albatros D.V fighter then entering service. It was the fastest German fighter at that time and the Inspectorate of Flying Troops (Inspektion der Fliegertruppen (Idflieg) ordered a batch of three aircraft for further testing. A pre-production batch of 20 aircraft was ordered in July contingent on passing the static load testing between 28 June and 3 July saw the wings pass, but the fuselage failed. A reinforced replacement was supplied by AEG and it passed on 4 August. Around this time the fuselage of the second prototype was lengthened to improve lateral stability and the aircraft's landing characteristics.

Idflieg then authorized flight tests by military pilots. A D.I crashed on 21 August due to unknown causes, but flight testing was completed on 25 August using another aircraft. AEG only had to fix some minor issues and the D.I would be approved for combat use. Fighter ace Walter Höhndorf spun out of control and crashed on 5 September, again due to unknown causes. Idflieg then cancelled the program after a few of the pre-production aircraft were completed.

== Variants ==
AEG. D.I
1917 prototype single-seat biplane fighter.
AEG Dr.I

1917 prototype single-seat triplane fighter.

== Specifications (AEG D.I) ==
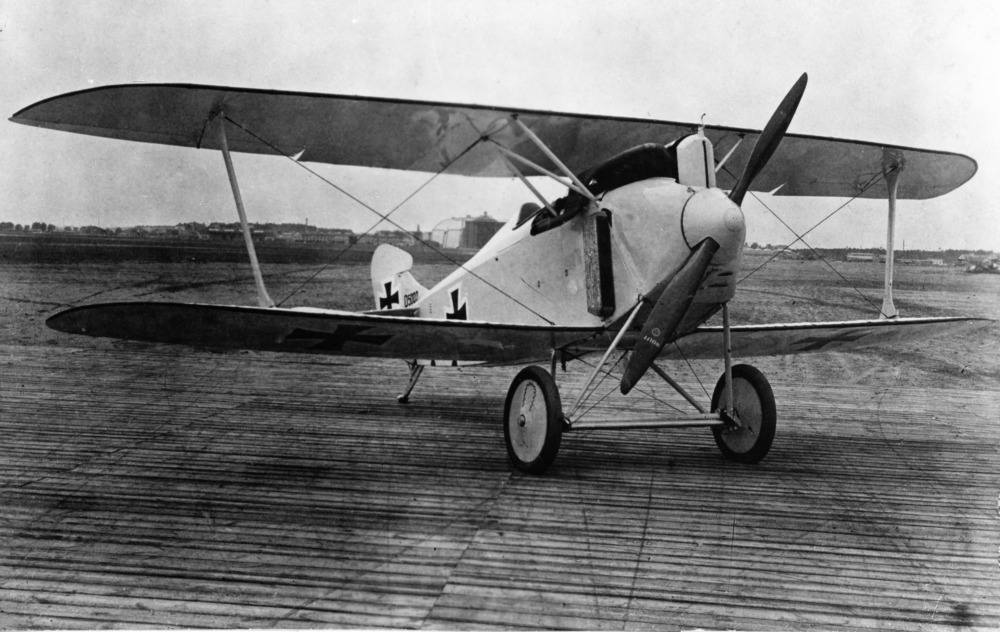
AEG D.I second version

Data from German Aircraft of the First World War; A.E.G. Aircraft of WWI: A Centennial Perspective on Great War Airplanes

General characteristics

- Crew: 1
- Length: 6.15 m (20 ft 2 in)
- Upper wingspan: 8.5 m (27 ft 11 in)
- Lower wingspan: 8.14 m (26 ft 8 in)
- Height: 2.54 m (8 ft 4 in)
- Wing area: 17.1 m^{2} (184 sq ft)
- Empty weight: 685 kg (1,510 lb)
- Gross weight: 945 kg (2,083 lb)
- Powerplant: 1 × Mercedes D.IIIa water-cooled, straight-six piston engine, 120 kW (160 hp)
- Propellers: 2-bladed

Performance

- Maximum speed: 225 km/h (140 mph, 121 kn)
- Time to altitude: 2.5 minutes to 1,000 m (3,300 ft)

Armament

- Guns: 2 x 7.92 mm (0.312 in) LMG 08/15 machine-guns

== See also ==
Related development

- AEG Dr.I

Related lists

- List of aircraft
- List of fighter aircraft
- List of military aircraft of Germany

== Bibliography ==
- Gray, Peter & Thetford, Owen (1987) [1970]. German Aircraft of the First World War (2nd ed.). London: Putnam. ISBN 0-85177-809-7.
- Green, William & Swanborough, Gordon (2001) [1994]. The Complete Book of Fighters: An Illustrated Encyclopedia of Every Fighter Built and Flown (Revised and Updated ed.). London: Salamander Books. ISBN 1-84065-269-1.
- Herris, Jack (2015). A.E.G. Aircraft of WWI: A Centennial Perspective on Great War Airplanes. Great War Aviation Centennial Series. Vol. 16. n. p.: Aeronaut Books. ISBN 978-1-935881-28-5.
