= The Bourne Identity =

The Bourne Identity may refer to:

- The Bourne Identity (novel), a 1980 novel by Robert Ludlum
- The Bourne Identity (1988 film), a made-for-television film adaptation of the novel, starring Richard Chamberlain and Jaclyn Smith
- The Bourne Identity (2002 film), a film adaptation of the novel, starring Matt Damon

== See also ==
- Bourne (franchise)
