= Pennsylvania Railroad class D1 =

PRR D1
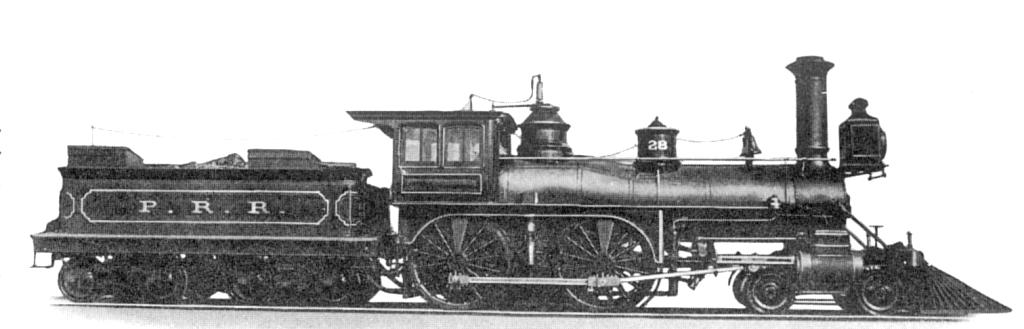
- D1 #28
Type and origin
- Power type: Steam
- Builder: PRR Altoona Works
- Build date: 1868–1872
- Total produced: 13
Specifications
- Configuration
  - Whyte: 4-4-0
  - UIC: 2′B
- Gauge: 4 ft 8 1/2 in (1,435 mm)
- Leading dia.: 26 in (660 mm)
- Driver dia.: 68 in (1,727 mm)
- Wheelbase: 22 ft 5 5/8 in (6.85 m) (locomotive); 44 ft 11 5/8 in (13.706 m) (overall)
- Length: 54 ft 6.44 in (16.6228 m)
- Width: 9 ft 0.94 in (2.77 m)
- Height: 14 ft 8 in (4.47 m)
- Adhesive weight: 42,370 lb (19.2 tonnes)
- Loco weight: 77,700 lb (35.2 tonnes)
- Tender weight: 51,400 lb (23.3 tonnes)
- Total weight: 129,100 lb (58.6 tonnes)
- Tender type: Eight-wheel with water scoop
- Fuel type: Soft coal
- Fuel capacity: 8,000 lb (3.6 tonnes)
- Water cap.: 2,400 US gal (9,100 L; 2,000 imp gal)

The Pennsylvania Railroad's steam locomotive class D1 (formerly Class A, pre-1895) comprised thirteen 4-4-0 locomotives for express passenger service, constructed at the railroad's own Altoona Works (now owned by Norfolk Southern) during 1868–1872. They were the first standardized class of locomotives on the railroad and shared many parts with other standard classes.

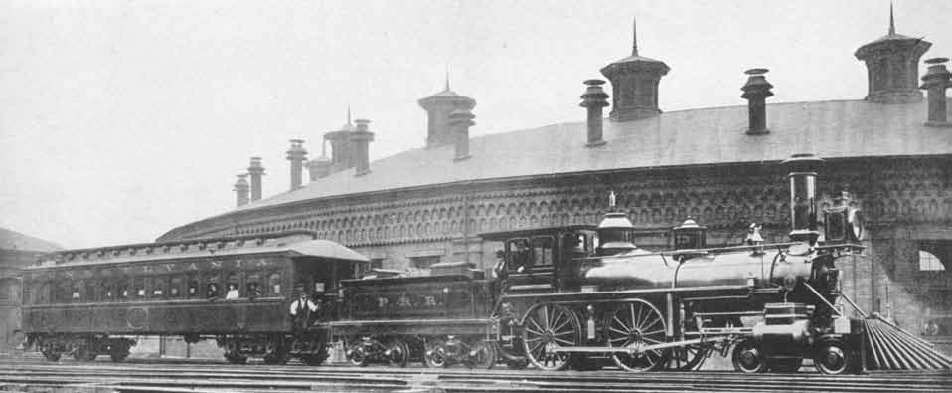
PRR D1 (then known as a class A) fitted with experimental Westinghouse air brake equipment during the trials of September 1869.

The PRR was the first American railroad to adopt the Westinghouse air brake, the first tests of which were made in September 1869; Class A locomotives were among those fitted with air brake equipment for those earliest tests.

They remained in service until 1945, and were all withdrawn and scrapped by 1946.
