= Eagles4kids =

Online educational resource

- Founded: 2010; 16 years ago
- Founder: Michael Lawrence; Darrin Briggs
- Location: Trempealeau County, Wisconsin, United States
- Region served: United States (2011); Worldwide
- Website: http://eagles4kids.weebly.com/ (previously http://www.eagles4kids.com/ see this for more info)

Eagles4kids is a student-teacher run interactive online resource on bald eagles, featuring two live video streams of eagle mating pairs and their nests. The website is a classroom project for a third and fourth grade combined classroom from Blair-Taylor Elementary School in Blair, Wisconsin. As of late 2019, the eagle cam focuses on two eagles named Blair and Taylor. People from over 145 countries have viewed the live stream, encompassing tens of thousands monthly viewers. As of 2015, the site had over 2 million views. Eagles4kids also has a partnership with the National Eagle Center in Wabasha, Minnesota.

== History ==
In the fall of 2010, teacher Michael Lawrence and his third- and fourth-grade students became interested in eagles after watching an eagle cam from California. Lawrence secured a grant for camera equipment and permission from a local landowner to set up a camera by a nearby eagle's nest. This camera was planted in a tree above the nest and can zoom in. Once the live stream was set up, the public was able to view the nest. When Lawrence moved out of the district, Darrin Briggs and his class took over the project. Briggs enhanced the project by adding a pan-tilt-zoom camera and adding audio to both cameras. Because the cameras are in a rural area, the connection is often lost, halting the live-stream. Many viewers comment that the live stream is like soap opera because there is so much eagle drama. Some viewers consider themselves “Eagleholics.”

=== Season 1 (school years 2010–2011) ===
After setting up the camera, students named the eagles Lucy and Larry. Lucy disappeared at the start of the egg laying period and left Larry alone at the nest. Many days later, another eagle came to the nest, but students concluded it did not behave like Lucy and it must be a different individual. Something strange was going on and it didn't appear the “old” Lucy would return. Students decided this eagle would be the “new” Lucy. Lucy did not lay any eggs that year.

=== Season 2 (2011–2012) ===
Lucy laid two eggs at the beginning of March, 2012. Once an eagle has laid its egg(s), both parents incubate them for about 35 days. The first egg hatched on April 7, 2012; the students named the first eagle Luke. The second egg hatched on April 10, 2012; the students named it Lilly. During this time, it became clear that the female eagle was a not the original Lucy. Since Larry was teaching "new" Lucy how to feed chicks, it appeared "new" Lucy was a first-time mother.

=== Season 3 (2012–2013) ===
Around November 2012, Lucy incurred a terrible injury to both of her feet. The injury on her right foot seemed severe enough that it raised concerns about her ability to survive. Lucy ended up losing her toes on her right foot. After seeing her injury, a decision had to be made about how to help Lucy. Efforts to trap Lucy failed and it was finally decided the best was to leave her alone. Larry took control and started to help Lucy. She ended up gaining more strength in her foot and was doing well without her full mobility. Then on March 9, 2013, Lucy laid an egg. More than a month later the egg popped and was destroyed.

=== Season 4 (2013–2014) ===
At the start of the season the eagles flew to and from the nest. Then, in about March, Lucy had not been seen for a while and a new female appeared at the nest with Larry. It was discovered that Larry had had two and possibly three females in the nest after Lucy left. No eggs were laid during this season.

=== Season 5 (2014-2015) ===
Larry was not spotted during the school term ending December 2014, and by February two new eagles appeared in the nest and seemed to be taking it over. The female eagle was named Blair and the male was named Taylor. In the middle of February the nest was attacked, apparently by Taylor. After the attack Taylor was not seen for a few weeks. On February 18, 2015, Blair laid her first egg, and a few days later her second appeared. The eagle that Taylor potentially attacked came to the nest but expressed no interest in helping incubate. On March 3, Taylor came back to the nest with substantial injuries. The eggs never hatched and were destroyed by a raccoon.
