= BHP Port Kembla D1 class =

Class of Australian diesel locomotives

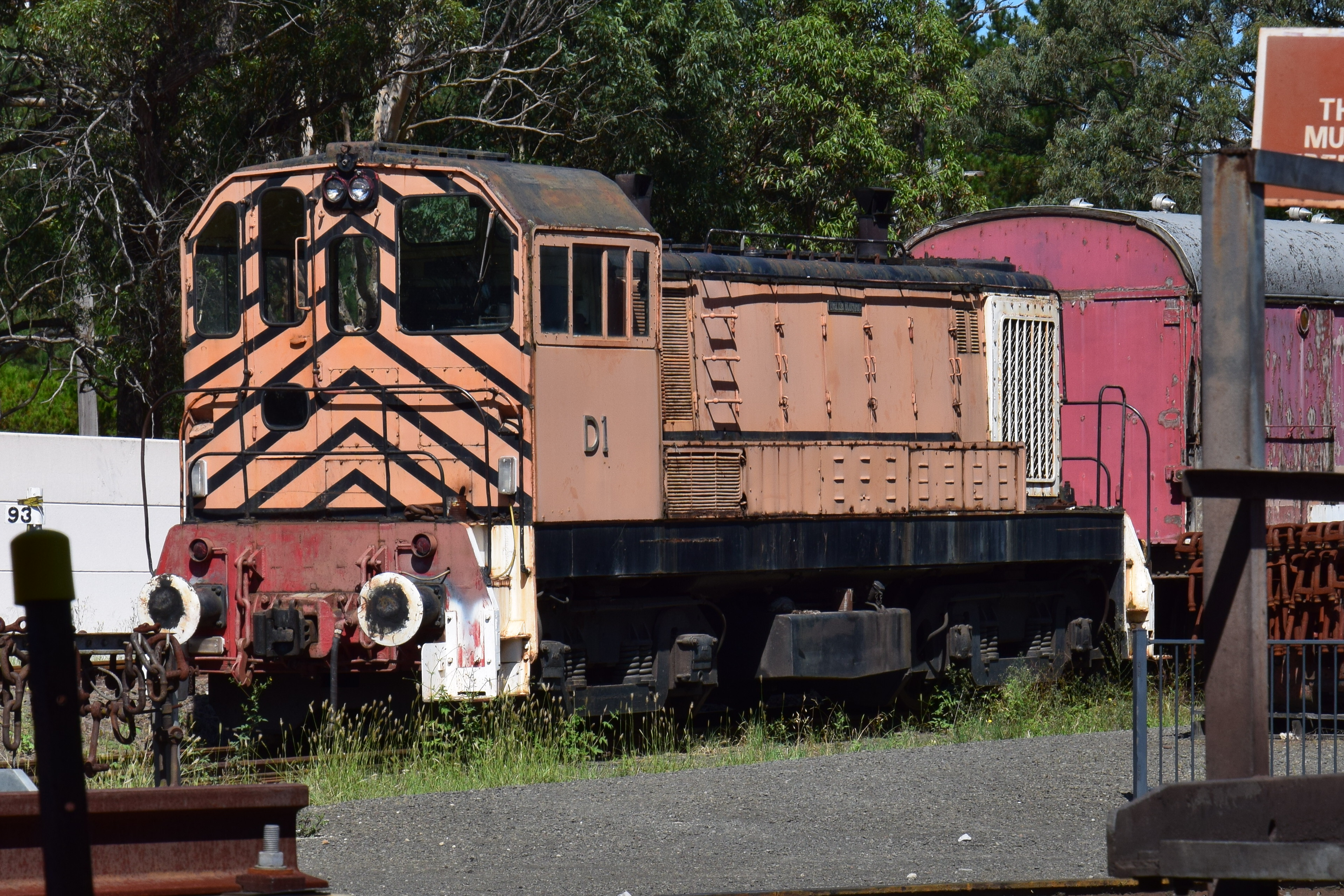
- D1 in storage at the NSW Rail Museum, 2016
Type and origin
- Power type: Diesel-electric
- Builder: Commonwealth Engineering, Granville
- Build date: 1950-1951
- Total produced: 8
Specifications
- Configuration
  - UIC: Bo-Bo
- Gauge: 1,435 mm (4 ft 8 1/2 in) standard gauge
- Wheel diameter: 3 ft 8 in (1,118 mm)
- Wheelbase: 30 ft 6 in (9.30 m)
- Length: 41 ft (12.50 m)
- Width: 9 ft 3 in (2,819 mm)
- Height: 14 ft (4,267 mm)
- Adhesive weight: 21.75 long tons (22.1 t; 24.4 short tons)
- Loco weight: 87 long tons (88.4 t; 97.4 short tons)
- Fuel type: Diesel
- Fuel capacity: 600 imp gal (2,700 L; 720 US gal)
- Lubricant cap.: 82 imp gal (370 L; 98 US gal)
- Coolant cap.: 100 imp gal (450 L; 120 US gal)
- Prime mover: English Electric 8SRKT Mk I
- RPM range: 450 to 750 rpm
- Engine type: four stroke, 8 in line, two valves per cylinder
- Aspiration: turbocharged
- Generator: English Electric 819
- Cylinders: 8
- Cylinder size: 10 in × 12 in (254 mm × 305 mm)
- Loco brake: Air
- Train brakes: Air
Performance figures
- Maximum speed: 21 miles per hour (34 km/h)
- Power output: 880 hp (660 kW) gross, 800 hp (600 kW) net
- Tractive effort
  - Starting: 57,000 lbf (253.5 kN)
  - Continuous: 23,500 lbf (104.5 kN) at 10.2 mph (20 km/h)
Career
- Operators: Australian Iron & Steel
- Number in class: 8
- Numbers: D1-D8
- First run: 4 May 1950
- Retired: 2004
- Preserved: D1, D6, D7
- Disposition: 3 preserved, 5 scrapped

The D1 class were a class of diesel locomotives built by Commonwealth Engineering, Granville with English Electric traction equipment for Australian Iron & Steel's, Port Kembla steelworks in 1950–1951.

== History ==
In May 1950, D1 became the first diesel to operate on an Australian main line. The eight D class locomotives hauled trains on Australian Iron & Steel's, Port Kembla until a downturn in the early 1980s saw most of the class withdrawn. D6 and D7 were reactivated with the former remaining in service until 2004.

Three have been preserved:

- D1 by the NSW Rail Museum, Thirlmere.
- D6 by the Lithgow State Mine Heritage Park & Railway, Lithgow. This unit is still stored in Port Kembla.
- D7 by the former ARHS ACT Division, Canberra.
