= ID (classification) =

Paralympic rowing classification

ID is an adaptive rowing classification. The classifications were developed and current as of March 2011.

== Definition ==
Rowing Australia defines this classification as "Rowers with an intellectual disability [Rowers with an intellectual disability are not eligible to compete at the Paralympics at the time of publication (March 2011)]"

== Events ==
Rowers in this classification compete in single and double sculls for club, state and national competitions. In international competitions, they compete in a mixed coxed four.

== Becoming classified ==
Classification is handled by FISA – International Rowing Federation.

Australians seeking classification through Rowing Australia need to provide several documents to a classifier at the time of application, including an AUSRAPID accreditation card, or International Sports Federation for Persons with an Intellectual Impairment (INAS-FID) ID card.

== At the Paralympic Games ==
For the 2016 Summer Paralympics in Rio, the International Paralympic Committee had a zero classification at the Games policy. This policy was put into place in 2014, with the goal of avoiding last minute changes in classes that would negatively impact athlete training preparations. All competitors needed to be internationally classified with their classification status confirmed prior to the Games, with exceptions to this policy being dealt with on a case-by-case basis.

== See also ==
- Adaptive rowing
- Adaptive rowing classification
- Rowing at the 2008 Summer Paralympics
- Rowing at the 2012 Summer Paralympics
