= LSM =

LSM may refer to:

== Science ==
- Laboratoire Souterrain de Modane (Modane Underground Laboratory), a particle physics laboratory in France
- Lanthanum strontium manganite, a crystal used as a cathode material
- Laser scanning microscopy, a microscopy technique used in biology and nano-crystal imaging
- Least squares method, a method in regression analysis
- LSm, a family of RNA-binding proteins
- LSM-775, a psychedelic drug similar to LSD, although less potent

== Sports ==
- Liga Super Malaysia (Malaysia Super League), a top-tier association football league in Malaysia
- Deportivo LSM, a Uruguayan soccer club established by Luis Suárez and Lionel Messi

== Technology ==
- Land Surface Model (LSM version 1.0), a unidimensional computational model
- Latent semantic mapping, for modelling data relationships
- Level-set method, for numerical analysis of interfaces and shapes
- Linear scheduling method, a project scheduling method for repetitive activities
- Linear synchronous motor, an electric motor
- Linux Security Modules, a modular framework for security checks in Linux
- Linux Software Map, file format
- Liquid state machine, a type of neural network
- Live Slow Motion Multicam (LSM), instant-replay software developed by EVS
- Log-structured merge-tree, a data structure

== Education ==
- Lourdes School of Mandaluyong, Philippines
- Louvain School of Management, Belgium

== Organizations ==
- Law Society of Manitoba
- Lesbian Sex Mafia, a female support group and BDSM organization
- Little St Mary's, an Anglo-Catholic parish in Cambridge
- Living Stream Ministry, religious publisher
- Lutheran Student Movement – USA

== Other uses ==
- A US Navy hull classification symbol: Landing ship medium (LSM)
- Libre Software Meeting, an annual free software event in France
- San Martín Line (Linea San Martín), commuter rail line in Buenos Aires
- Local store marketing, a marketing term
- Mexican Sign Language (Lengua de Señas Mexicana)
- Maltese Sign Language (Lingwa tas-Sinjali Maltija)
- Public Broadcasting of Latvia (Latvijas sabiedriskais medijs), a publicly funded radio and television organization in Latvia
- Living Standards Measure, a classification of standard of living in South Africa
