= Xedio =

Professional broadcast application suite

Xedio is a professional HD/SD modular application suite for News and Sports Production developed by EVS Broadcast Equipment.

Intended for broadcast professionals, it handles the acquisition, production, media management and the playout of News and sport media. Xedio suite integrates a non-linear editing system. This editor has been included in the IPDirector suite as a plug-in.

This solution is used by Channel One (Russia), RTL-TVI (Belgium), GOL TV (Spain), RTCG (Montenegro), BHRT (Bosnia and Herzegovina), Sky News (UK), ....

== History ==
year	OS	Version	Comments/changes
Sep 2006	WinNT	2.0	SD, HD 1080i, StoryCutter (Rough Cut), Media Object Server Gateway, ActiveX NCS, LoRes/HiRes
Dec 2006	WinNT	2.1	FPD DIVArchive support
May 2007	WinNT	2.3	DVCPRO HD, Avid DNxHD, MJPEG HD, CDM[2], Task Engine, Dalet, ENPS
Nov 2007	WinXP/ Windows Server 2003	2.4	Multicam Editing,
May 2008	WinXP/ Windows Server 2003	2.5	XDCAM HD, SQL Server 2005, DB API
Oct 2008	WinXP/ Windows Server 2003	2.6	8 Audio Channels (5.1), HeaderMaker, Ingest API, vizRT NLE Plugin, XT[2] Direct Access
May 2009	WinXP/ Windows Server 2003	2.7	Direct Rendering (GbE) to XT[2]
Apr 2010	WinXP/ Windows Server 2003	3.0	Full SD/HD Support, Xedio IO (SD/HD), Custom Metadata, Titling Tool, Partial Restore (DIVArchive), iNews, EDL Export to Avid/Final Cut Pro
Dec 2010	WinXP/ Windows Server 2003		3.1
Dec 2011	Win7/ WinXP/ Windows Server 2008	4.1	CleanEdit Edit-In-Place, 720p full support, Canon HD XF Support, Windows 7 Support, Xedio Add-On (make local)

== See also ==
- EVS Broadcast Equipment
