= XS (server) =

Belgian studio production server

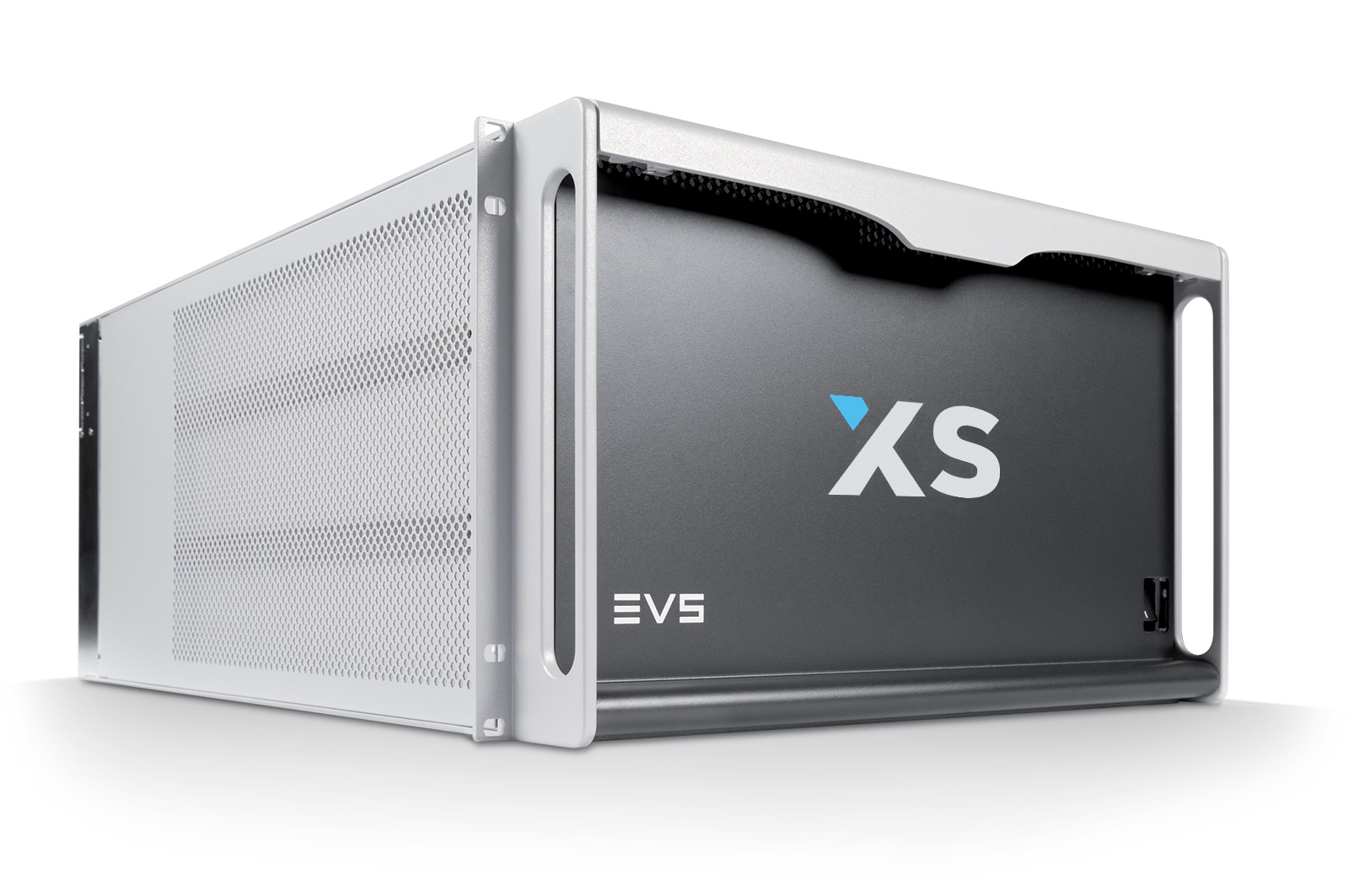
The XS server.

XS is the studio production server of the Belgian company EVS Broadcast Equipment.

It has been inspired from the XT3 server but can be controlled by dedicated controllers from EVS for the studio environment: Xsense, IPDirector, Xscreen, Insio or by non-EVS controllers such as automation systems, linear or hybrid editors, switchers and controllers through API or standard protocols.

Designed to replace VTRs, the server allows incoming feeds to be recorded, quickly enriched by metadata and played out or instantly streamed or transferred to post-production.

The server benefits from loop recording and allows to record, control and play media. It has from 2 to 6 channels SD/HD and 6-channel 3D/1080p (3G or dual link) and offers the same features in a 3D environment. It supports several formats and codec, with specific codecs for News environment.

It is widely used in News environments and sometimes in Sports.
