= Speidel =

American watchmaker

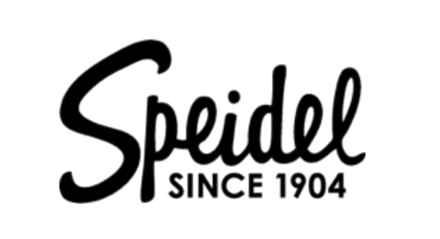
- Company type: Private
- Industry: Watch straps
- Founded: 1904; 122 years ago; East Providence, Rhode Island, United States; (as The Speidel Chain Company)
- Headquarters: East Providence, Rhode Island, United States., United States
- Area served: Worldwide
- Parent: Textron (Former), Hirsch Armbänder (Former).
- Website: speidel.com

Speidel is a manufacturer of watchbands and related items based in East Providence, Rhode Island, United States. It was originally founded in Germany by Friedrich Speidel in 1867 as a manufacturer of gold and silver chains. The Speidel Chain Company was formed in its modern state in the United States in 1904. It was known for its "Ratchet-buckle" watchbands (introduced in 1920), the "Scissors Action Expansion Band" (introduced in 1936), the ladies' "Mignon" watchbands (introduced in 1939), plus costume jewelry. In the 1930s, Speidel was the first company in the world to introduce ID bracelets. During World War II, the company briefly produced cathode-ray tubes. Speidel experienced a boom in popularity, notably with their invention of the hugely popular expanding strap in the mid-1930s, and in addition to watchbands Speidel produced wristwatches, lighters, writing instruments, small jewelry, and other accessories, before beginning to decline by the end of the century with the struggle to compete with cheaper overseas production, and the boom in quartz watches.

== History ==
Friedrich Speidel founded the Speidel Company in 1867. With an initial investment equivalent to US$10, Speidel started making gold and silver chains with his wife, in the basement of his home in Pforzheim, Germany. He has been credited with developing the gold-over-metal method of manufacturing called "bi-metal" (also incorrectly known as gold "plating") which proved successful. In 1896 he built the company's first factory, installing state-of-the-art machines for the production of gold chain, previously manufactured entirely by hand.

Friedrich Speidel sent his three sons, Albert, Edwin and Eugene to America to establish a branch of the family's jewelry chain manufacturing business. The Speidel Chain Company was officially founded in the United States in 1904.

By 1912 the Speidel brothers hired the architectural firm Monks & Johnson to design the company's first headquarters. The five-story building, with its European-style front, was originally called the Doran-Speidel Building.

In 1937, Albert Speidel died young from pneumonia. His brother Edwin, founder of the Automatic Chain Company, became president of Speidel Corporation. Paul Levinger was made vice-president. At that time, the majority control of the business was held by the German family. However, in 1939, all of the shares held by the German stockholders were purchased by Edwin Speidel and Paul Levinger.

== Early-mid 1900s and Growth ==
At first, only jewelry chain was made in the new facilities. During the 1920s, costume jewelry and watchbands were added to the line. Men's watchbands surged in popularity due to their use in the military during World War I. In the early 1920s, Albert Speidel formed Speidel Brothers, and produced watch bracelets manufactured and sold primarily to wholesalers.

Both the Speidel family in Germany and the brothers who lived in the United States merged into the Speidel Corporation in 1928. The first president of Speidel Corporation was Albert Speidel, one of the Speidel brothers living in Providence, Rhode Island. In 1934 Paul Levinger was hired by Speidel Corporation as a plant foreman.

=== WWII and Electronic Components ===
Watchband production was cut back during World War II when Speidel converted most of its facilities and started manufacturing cathode ray tubes for radar and other electronic applications. However Speidel returned to watchbands as soon as peace returned. In 1947 Speidel brought out its first modernized version of the scissor-type expansion band called the Golden Knight. It proved to be a tremendous success in the men's watch bracelet field. The company also introduced elaborate packaging for its line of watch bracelets.

== Expansion and National Prominence ==
The company instituted a planned reduction of costume jewelry, leading to its discontinuation from the Speidel product line in the early 1950s. After the end of World War II, Speidel began to advertise nationally, first in magazines and then in radio with a program called "Stop the Music." The successful campaign made Speidel well known in the US. Speidel discontinued its radio ads in 1949, opting to spend its ad dollars on TV campaigns. The company fully sponsored different TV programs, making Speidel one of the earliest television advertisers in the United States.

=== Korean War and Military Manufacturing ===
As the Korean War got underway in 1951, Speidel began manufacturing identification bracelets. The first product in this category was the Photo Ident, a combination identification bracelet with photo and an expandable wristband. Speidel advertised it on television, and it proved an immediate success.

In 1956, Speidel introduced men's jewelry. The move was designed to diversify its inventory, and fend off increasingly heavy competition from Japan. Speidel also changed its method to sole distributors, in strategic geographic locations, and built a sales force to cover the United States.

=== The 'Twist-O-Flex' Bracelet ===
In 1946, E.F.M. Speidel was awarded U.S. patent 145467, entitled "Design For An Expansible Link Chain For Watch Bracelet Or The Like". In the 1950s, Speidel invested heavily in the development of automatic equipment to produce a bracelet similar to the German Fixo-Flex watchband. A German manufacturer had sent the first version of the Fixo-Flex to Paul Levinger who had worked out a license contract with the inventor who held the German patent, Karl E. Stiegle. In 1956, the first automatically produced bracelet under Stiegel's patent was introduced as a test under the Kingsway brand. By 1959, the company officially introduced the new watchband as the "Twist-O-Flex".

Speidel introduced the Euro-Flex in 1988, an updated version of the Twist-O-Flex watchband. The new watchband used heavier materials and contemporary European styling. Speidel continued to expand its line of products with the introduction of the "Signet" watch line in 1994; a patented plastic top shell watchband in 1995; and the first watchband with rubberized coating in 1996.

=== Change of Ownership & International Expansion ===
By 1964 the company, now owned by Paul Levinger, had grown significantly both in size and importance to the jewelry industry. Levinger sold the company to Textron, Inc. in May 1964. By 1966 Speidel had expanded its distribution capacity and entered the men's toiletries market, with the introduction of the men's fragrance British Sterling. The company aggressively marketed the product with such enduring phrases as, "Make him a legend in his own time," which helped to create a market success without parallel. Speidel became one of Textron's top local divisions in sales volume and performance.

The company began to expand its marketing reach internationally in the 1970s, beginning with Canada in 1971. The company furthered its sales market by branching out to Australia and New Zealand in 1972. Great Britain and Ireland in 1973; and Germany, Switzerland, Norway, Sweden, Denmark and Finland in 1974.

== 1972-Present ==
In the midst of their international sales expansion, Speidel started OEM (Original Equipment Manufacturing) Business Supplies in 1972. OEM manufactured outsourced metal watchbands for watch companies such as Seiko, which at the time had just introduced the "quartz" watch, the first totally machine-assembled timepiece, which dramatically reduced watch prices. That same year, Speidel began its watchband replacement program for mass merchandisers, making it much easier for consumers to find the appropriately sized watchband replacement at their local store.

In 1997, Textron sold Speidel to the Austrian-based Hirsch Armbänder AG, a leading manufacturer of leather watchbands in Europe. The new company was Hirsch Speidel Inc. Two years later, as part of a global manufacturing consolidation strategy, Hirsh closed Speidel's original Ship Street property and relocated its headquarters to East Providence. In coordination with the move, Speidel closed down its manufacturing operations and outsourced its workload. A portion of the production continued in Rhode Island with local manufacturing companies, and the balance moved overseas.

In 2002, the company's ownership once again returned to the United States, when JRM Holdings bought Speidel from Hirsch Armbänder. Five years later Fred Levinger (Son of Paul Levinger) acquired Speidel. In 2009, Cerce Capital LLC purchased Speidel's assets for US$1.65 million. The purchase was part of a bankruptcy settlement. Speidel has now been revived as a brand, and sells old and new watch strap lines.

== The Speidel Family ==
In 1937 Albert Speidel died at an early age from pneumonia. His brother Edwin, the founder of the Automatic Chain Company —who had not been active in the Speidel Corporation up to that time— became president of Speidel Corporation, and Paul Levinger was made vice-president. The majority ownership of the business was held by the German family, but in 1939, all of the shares held by the German stockholders were purchased by Edwin Speidel and Paul Levinger.
