= C-Cast =

Software that allows broadcasters to stream live content

C-Cast is a software developed by the Belgian company EVS Broadcast Equipment which allows broadcasters to stream live content, such as clips or alternative angles, from their video servers XT3, to the audience's second screen or smart TV while watching the event on the television (main screen).

The final application (on iPad, iPhone, connected TV or else), to be developed by the broadcaster or the right holder, allows the audience to review different angles while they are watching the main event on television.

Released in 2011, C-Cast has won several awards.
