= Epsio =

Epsio is a suite developed by the Belgian company EVS Broadcast Equipment which allows virtual graphic overlay insertions in real-time or in instant replays. All these effects can instantly be added with the Multicam (LSM) remote controller and are immediately available. Operators can also insert virtual advertisements allowing the field advertisements to adapt to the audience.

== Graphics ==
Editorial graphics can be an offside line, the 9.15 m (10.01 yd) circle for the direct free kick, the distance to the goal or the scores and logos insertions.

== FIFA ==
The software was introduced in 2010 for the FIFA World Cup and it is now widely used in sport events, with different modules available.
