= Kreyos =

American consumer electronics company

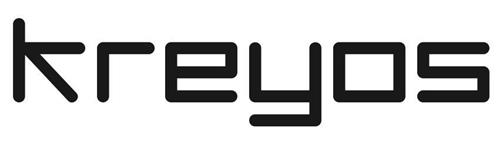
- Official Kreyos logo
- Founded: 2012
- Defunct: c. September 2014
- Headquarters: San Francisco, California

Kreyos was a consumer electronics company based in San Francisco, California. The company intended to develop digital wearable devices fitted for people with active lifestyles. The Kreyos Meteor, the company's first product, started as a crowd funding campaign from Indiegogo. Although the campaign was funded to a bit more than fifteen times its original goal, the resulting product was poorly received, many units were not delivered or were defective, and the company was closed in 2014.

== History ==
Initially a crowd funded project from Indiegogo, Kreyos raised $1.5 Million for the Meteor, surpassing the original goal of $100,000. The duration of bidding lasted for nearly three months - from June 23 to August 12, 2013. Their next big update came on 10/08/2013 when they provided footage of an engineer test. The first delay was announced on 11/13/2013. Kreyos stated during their pilot production run they discovered the position of the speaker holes in the Meteor case muffled the speaker and it wasn't their idea of how to put out the best product they can develop. The solution they implement to solve this problem also increase the overall volume by 25%. As a result, this changed the delivery date from January 2014 to mid February 2014.

On November 22, 2013 Kreyos apologized for the first time about the lack of communication. On 12/08/2013 they announced their presence at CES 2014. On December 24, 2013 Kreyos sent out an update talking about implementing and testing the changes to improve the speaker, submission of the latest Meteor for official FCC, CE, and IC testing and providing dates for the next the production run 6 days later. On Jan 10th of 2014 a video was sent out showing the functionality of the watch with Siri in attempt to calm backers.

On January 22 the second delay came pushing back the delivery date to April. This time the delay was cause because of an “echoing” issue identified in the late stages of hardware testing. On Jan 28th they announced a solution to the problem along with a commitment to be more transparent to backers in regards to all things related to development and making sure they updated backers as often as possible moving forward. After Further testing on Feb 11th they announced the problem was solved and that the entire senior management team was overseeing activity related to this fix in our production facilities and were manufacturing the new molds to fix the existing hardware. In an attempt to thank those who didn't ask for a refund Kreyos offered a limited edition belt clip and a 40% discount on the Meteor 2 for all backers.

Kreyos' next update, on March 21 contained a video showing the watch interacting with Google Now on the Android platform along with images of the UI for the iPhone. In April they also announce the special color of the belt clip which backers voted on. The color was Grey. At the end of April came another delay, at not fault of Kreyos, which moved the delivery date back to the end of May. This time the delay was a result of a delay in the delivery of new speaker components. Then on May 16 the day after the next production run was supposed to start Kreyos announced a destructive storm hit their production facilities in Guangdong province and manufacturing has stalled due to flooding in the factory.

By the end of May, Kreyos said they were shipping the first 5,000 units to the United States to be distributed to backers. Later Kreyos said that the units would be sent to backer according to when they backed the Indiegogo. This meant that any backers before June or July 2013 had a chance at finally receiving the watch. They stated that the vessel should take 3 to 4 weeks to transport the unit from the manufacture to the United States. Kreyos addressed and apologized for their iOS app, which wasn't 100% ready, saying they submitted the app in advance since there's been some situations where the app isn't approved for a long period of time. Orders started to be received by backers from the beginning of August 2014.

As of August 17, 2014 the Android app and iOS app are still having issues - everything from disconnecting from the phone to not syncing at all. The Windows Phone app has yet to be released. This has been extremely bothersome to backers as all functionality other than basic watch functions are dependent on app for it to work properly.

== Closure ==
On the 15th of September 2014, Steve Tan (owner of the company) issued a statement outlining the reasons for the project's failure and that the company would close. Tan describes Kreyos as having only marketing and sales experience, and that therefore the technical work on the project and most of the funding had been outsourced to an acquaintance in the ODM business. Said ODM then failed to meet project goals, and Kreyos had neither the experience nor finances to resolve the problems. Tan alleges that this was a deliberate effort to defraud Kreyos and use its resources to create a turnkey smartwatch solution for other companies. The statement explained that the company had no funds left to issue further refunds, that they were unable to persuade the ODM to address software and firmware issues, and that they would be selling whatever components and tooling they could recover from the ODM before permanently closing the business. The remaining software was released under an open source licence.

== Kreyos Meteor ==
The Kreyos Meteor is a smart watch created and developed by Kreyos and is considered as its flagship product.

Kreyos Meteor
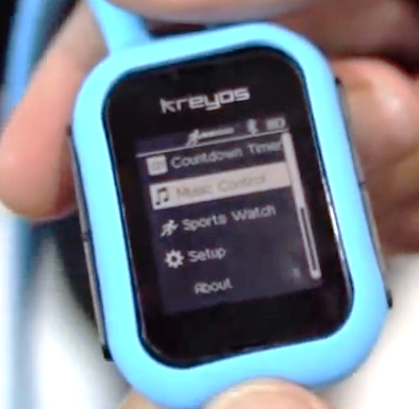
- The Kreyos Meteor smartwatch in light blue lanyard.
- Manufacturer: Kreyos
- Type: Smart Watch
- First released: April 2014
- Operating system: iOS 4+, Android 2.3+,
- Battery: 150 mAh Lithium; Run time: 1-2 days
- Display: 1.26-inch 144x168 px Memory LCD Screen; Always on
- Connectivity: Bluetooth 4.0 LE and ANT+

=== Features ===
The Meteor promised voice and gesture controls for sending messages and emails, making calls, and changing the music on your phone; however, none of these promised features materialized in the final product. It displays all options and information through an ultra low energy 1.26-inch memory LCD Screen. It has a backlight and a vibrating motor, along with an alarm that can be set through the device itself. Sensors include a three-axis gyrometer, falling short of the alleged six-axis accelerometer and a gyrometer. for connectivity purposes, the Meteor sometimes uses a Bluetooth 4.0 low energy and is compatible to Android, iOS and Windows Phone 8 devices. The watch also offers ANT+ connectivity, allowing it to connect to a cyclocomputer and a heart rate monitor, along with other such peripheral technology. Other missing features include an app-programmable gesture control system, Siri, Google Now and voice command support, a 'Find your Phone' option as well as cloud storage for keeping fitness information and other data.

The Meteor has a built-in microphone and low-quality speaker, specific tracking modes for cycling and running, and a number of other built-in activity trackers. The unit is detachable from the watchband, and can be transferred to a lanyard or a belt clip.

=== Reception ===
Pre-release discussions were positive. However numerous delays, technical issues, and unmet goals meant that the project was very poorly received in practice.

The latest criticism on the Meteor is the recent delay in shipping due to an echoing issue that was discovered in a recent test. With the shipping date moved to April, there has been a collective sense of frustration among the early buyers and backers of the watch. Despite this, the team assures that they foresee no more delays in the future as recent testing suggested that the fix they identified does address the issue permanently. The Meteor was then set to be released in April 2014. After a further delay, the Meteor was set to be delivered to the first 5,000 backers by the end of July. Instead, the backers were once again made to wait, while pre-orders close to the distribution center were completed first.

Further criticism is the fact that Kreyos failed to release an App for the watch despite the fact that some devices had been delivered. They claimed to be wanting to release the app at the same time to ensure customers all had the same version, maintaining the App is currently with the App store just waiting for the go ahead from themselves. Social media is rife with doubt and unrest at Kreyos's lack of action.

Kreyos has also recently come under scrutiny from its backers for posting on its Facebook page that the watch was only waterproof up to 1 meter depth for 30 minutes, and also that the watch has a 3-axis gyroscope. This is contrary to the information originally given about the watch and also (as of July 27) still on their website that states the watch contains a 6-axis gyroscope as well as being waterproof up to 5 meters. Kreyos have also been under heavy fire for their lack of information and consistent vague statements on delays and deadlines. Additionally, Kreyos has responded to negative feedback by deleting the comments and links to the Better Business Bureau left on their social networks. In a statement announcing the closure of the company, Steve Tan stated that the watch cannot be considered at all waterproof in its current state.
