= Pierre De Muelenaere =

Pierre de Muelenaere (born 25 October 1958) is a Belgian entrepreneur and scientist. He is the co-founder of IRIS (Image Recognition Integrated Systems), a leading company in the information management industry. In 2018 he became CEO of EVS Broadcast Equipment.

== Biography ==
De Muelenaere was born in Brussels. He received a civil engineering Degree in Electronics from the Université Catholique de Louvain in 1981 and a PhD in Applied science in 1987, from the same university.

His original background is Integrated circuit design and Artificial Intelligence. During his PhD, he developed new microprocessor architectures dedicated to very fast Image Processing and Recognition. A prototype of a complete OCR system was also built in the university labs, based on a new generation of custom Image Processing ICs.

With the support of the Belgian holding Ackermans & van Haaren, and together with fellow PhD student Jean-Didier Legat, de Muelenaere founded IRIS (Image Recognition Integrated Systems) in April 1987, to bring this invention to the market, develop and market Optical character recognition (OCR) and Intelligent Document Recognition (IDR) products.

De Muelenaere led IRIS through all its development steps as president and CEO of the company. In 1992, de Muelenaere and Pierre Rion performed a Management buyout. In 1999, I.R.I.S. was introduced on the Brussels Stock Exchange, (BXS, now NYSE Euronext) and received the "1999 Best Belgian IPO Award" from BXS. I.R.I.S. had more than 500 staff, with offices in Belgium, Luxembourg, France, Germany, The Netherlands, Norway, USA and Hong-Kong. In 2008, the revenue was over €100million. Over the years, de Muelenaere has been a main contributor to the R&D vision of I.R.I.S. and has contributed to the development of many new I.R.I.S. technologies and products and to a number of patents filed by the company. He also established strategic agreements with international partners in the US, Europe and Asia such as HP, Canon, Kodak, Adobe, Fujitsu and Siemens.

In 2009, de Muelenaere initiated a strategic partnership with Canon and a first investment of 17% of Canon in IRIS. In 2012, de Muelenaere negotiated the full takeover of IRIS by Canon. The company was the delisted from the stock market. Until the end of 2015, de Muelenaere remained President & CEO of IRIS and focused on the development of new technological and commercial partnerships with Canon.

At the end of 2015, he decided to leave the company to start new projects.

He has published a book on the IRIS adventure called "The IRIS Book: a 33 years story on Entrepreneurship from Belgium and what you can learn about it" . This book is intended to share experience with the new generation of entrepreneurs.

He has also started new projects such as the Yncubator (www.yncubator.be, the incubator for students-entrepreneurs at the Université Catholique de Louvain) and is a member of the investment committee at the QBIC Venture Capital fund (www.qbic.be, a fund financing spin-offs of several Belgian universities)

He was the president and CEO of IRIS Group until the end of 2015, and a member of the board of several companies, including BSB, Proximus, and Pairi Daiza.

Pierre De Meulenaere is currently teaching creation, growth and management of enterprises at UCLouvain university.

== Awards ==
De Muelenaere has received several Belgian awards including two innovation awards from the Walloon Region (1989 and 2007), the "2001 Manager of the year award" from Trends, the "2002 Entrepreneur of the year award", the "2008 ICT personality of the year award" from DataNews.
