= OpenCube Technologies =

French software company

- Industry: Computer hardware Computer software Consumer electronics Digital distribution
- Founded: April 1, 2003 in Toulouse, France
- Headquarters: Toulouse, France
- Area served: Worldwide
- Parent: EVS Broadcast Equipment
- Website: www.opencubetech.com

Open Cube Solutions, LLC was a French company headquartered in Toulouse and a member of the group, EVS Broadcast Equipment.

Established in April 2003, Open Cube Technologies develops, manufactures, licenses, and supports a wide range of software and hardware for the broadcast and cinema industries.

Active in computing, broadcast and video, OpenCube Technologies provides MXF-format solutions (MXF server, MXF player, MXF converter, MXF Toolkit) and media content management services.

OpenCube has been acquired by EVS Broadcast Equipment in 2010 and is now part of the EVS Media division.

The company has been awarded in 2008 at the SATIS (Salon international de l'audiovisuel of Paris) for its product P2SoftHD.

Its customers are Airbus, MTV, and 20th Century Fox.

== See also ==
- MXF
- EVS Broadcast Equipment
