= Loop recording =

Never-ending audio and video recording process

Loop recording is the process of recording audio continuously to an endless tape (if magnetic tape is used) or to computer memory, or recording video feeds (such as from video surveillance or camera signals) on a video server. This process is a never-ending one: at the end of the internal disk drive, the recording process continues to record at the beginning, erasing the previously recorded material and replacing it with the new content.

Generally, it is possible to write-protect some selected parts (as video clips) to prevent erasure.

This process is used on video servers to allow continuous recording, and instant access to any material ingested in the previous hours. This guarantees that the recorder will never miss an action in some live events such as live sports.

== Video servers ==
This process is used in:

- the XT[2] server from EVS Broadcast Equipment company
- the APA-IT LoopRecorder.
