= Linux Software Map =

Software metadata database and file format

Linux Software Map (LSM) is a standard text file format for describing Linux software. It also refers to the database constructed from these files. LSM is one of the standard methods for announcing a new software release for Linux.

== File format ==
If a Linux program is to be distributed widely, an LSM file may be created to describe the program, normally in a file called software_package_name.lsm. This file begins with Begin4 and ends with End. It has one field on each line. The field name is separated from the value by a colon (:). Mandatory fields are Title, Version, Entered-date, Description, Author and Primary-site.

== Example ==
Here is a what a blank LSM template looks like, at time of writing:

Begin4
Title:
Version:
Entered-date:
Description:
Keywords:
Author:
Maintained-by:
Primary-site:
Alternate-site:
Original-site:
Platforms:
Copying-policy:
End

== Database ==
The collective database of LSM entries can be searched in order to locate software of a particular type. This database has passed through various owners. It was created by Jeff Kopmanis, Lars Wirzenius maintained it for a while, and now the current maintainer is Aaron Schrab (with help from volunteers).

The database can be downloaded in its entirety, or one can perform limited queries using a web interface.

As of August 2022, the LSM index is still automatically updated by a e-mail robot. However, the maintainer of man-db eventually decided to stop maintaining its LSM data due to the perceived obsolescence of LSM.
