= XT3 =

Video server

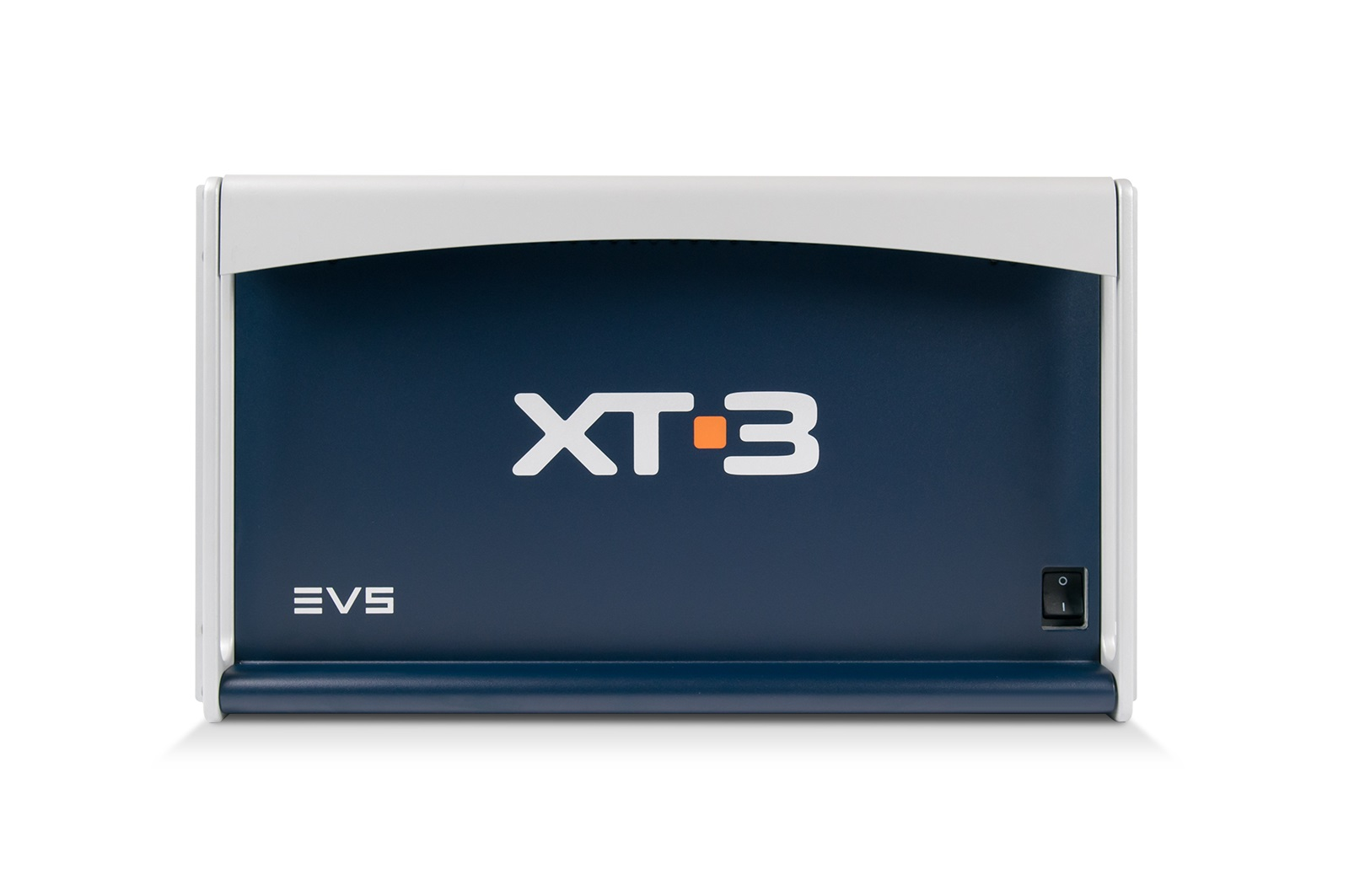
The XT3 server

XT3 is a model of the XT video server. It was created in 2011 by Belgian company EVS Broadcast Equipment. XT is end-of-support since December, 31 2023

== Features ==
This video server was built and designed to allow broadcasters to record, control and play media. It is capable of handling up to 12 channels of SD/HD, 6 channels of 3D/1080p (3G or dual link), as well as 3 channels in 4K resolution.

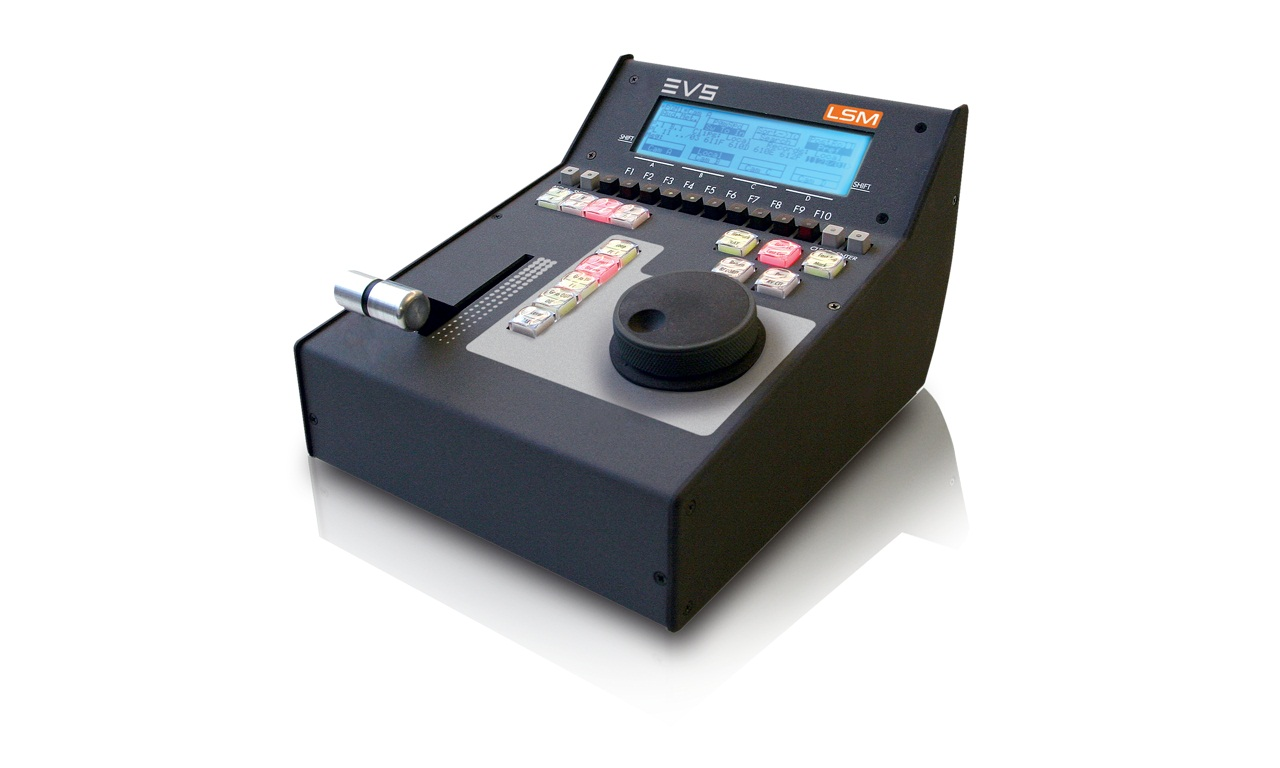
Multicam(LSM) which controls XT3 servers or previous generations (XT2+, XT2, XT)

The tapeless server allows loop recording and functions such as replays, slow-motion, non-linear editing or streaming while recording.

The server is controlled by Multicam(LSM) or IPDirector software. With the Multicam(LSM), instant replay of any live camera angle at variable speed is possible.

The server inspired the XS model, dedicated to specific studio environments and controllers.

== Applications ==
XT servers have been used in global sporting events productions such as the FIFA World Cup, the IFAF World Cup, MotoGP, Formula 1, BBC Football Programmes, the Olympic Games and in studio environments such as NBC, Sky, France 2 and CCTV or others.

This configuration is used in most OB vans around the world. and has received Emmy Award for this.
