= Multicam (LSM) =

Software for broadcasting

Multicam LSM (Live Slow Motion) is software developed by the Belgian company EVS Broadcast Equipment. Combined with its remote controller, it allows controlling the XT3 video server.

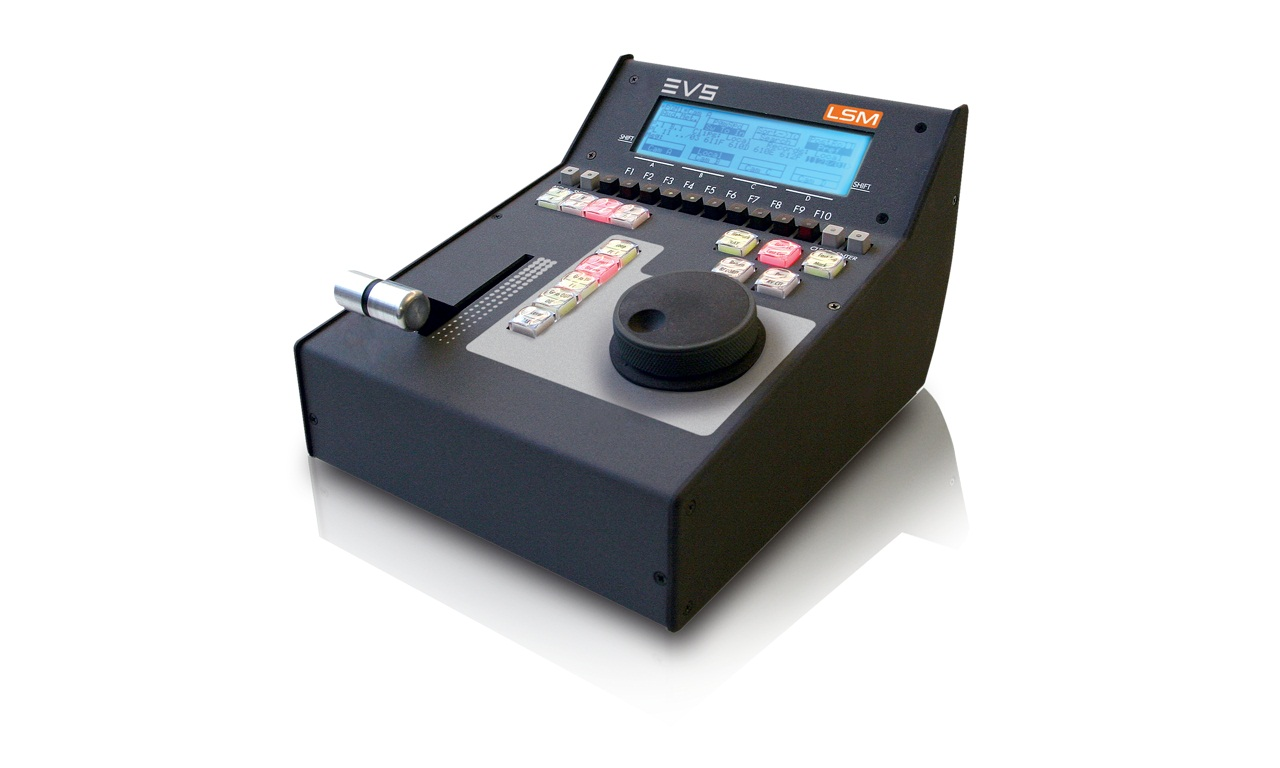
Multicam(LSM) remote controller from EVS company

This software and the production server allows broadcasters to record, control and play media. Originally developed for sports production, the XT[2] is now present in nearly each OB van in all last big sportive events as FIFA World Cup, IFAF World Cup, MotoGP and Olympic Games and is actually used in the biggest studio broadcasts such as NBC, France 2, CCTV and many more.

The multicam LSM's features are Instant replay, slow-motion, High-motion, super motion, Rough cut, editing, video playlist and content management.

Combined with the remote controller, it allows users to instantly make clips of ingested media, review multiple camera angles and replay them at any speed between -400 and + 400% at a very high quality (HD or SD).

This software and its widely known controller have become a standard, as part of each OB Van in sport productions. The LSM name has been adopted as the name of the person in charge of making the slow-motion replays (LSM Operator) in countries apart from the United States. Today, there are approximately 5,000 LSM operators in the world.

In the United States, Germany and Norway, the LSM is commonly referred to as an EVS or Elvis, and operators as EVS operators, despite the fact that EVS manufactures other products besides the LSM.
