= IPDirector =

Suite of content-management software

IPDirector is a suite of content management software developed by the Belgian company EVS Broadcast Equipment. The tool groups several video production management applications, providing ingest control and playout of video feeds from an accompanying video server.

The combination of software and production server allows broadcasters to record, control and play media. Furthermore, ingest control, workflow management, metadata management, 'rough cut' on-the-fly editing and playout control features are also included.

Originally developed for sports production, the XT3 is often found in Outside Broadcasting trucks covering many sporting events such as the FIFA World Cup, IFAF World Cup, MotoGP and Olympic Games. The product can also be found contributing to programmes from broadcasters including NBC, France 2, CCTV, BBC and others.
