= Local store marketing =

Marketing strategy

Local store marketing (LSM), also known as "neighborhood marketing," or simply "local marketing," is a marketing strategy that targets consumers/customers within a radius around a physical location with marketing messages tailored to the local populace. Tactics can be varied but are differentiated by the localization of the marketing message.

Often, local store marketing is employed by individual locations of a larger corporate entity - e.g. a franchise store rather than the franchisor - to supplement mass-market advertising campaigns. However, independent and regional retailers utilize the same strategy and tactics in their marketing efforts.

== Techniques ==
Local store marketing includes a vast array of marketing tactics utilized by businesses everywhere. Some of these include promotion of business in a local chamber of commerce, direct mail, issuing local press releases, hosting events, sponsorships, purchasing ad space in print, outdoor, or local television, etc.

=== Retailer vs Manufacturer ===
Local marketing can be studied from both the retailer and manufacturer perspectives. For the retailer, local marketing implies optimization of the store's marketing mixes both in-store and out of the store. For the manufacturer, local marketing involves optimizing a product's marketing mix at the store level.

=== In-store Marketing Tactics ===
In-store marketing varies depending upon the entity managing the marketing - the retailer and manufacturer have different vantage points and means at their disposal. Many in-store marketing tactics can be employed by either entity.

- Good customer service
- Loyalty cards
- Hosting events
- Upsell via package deals
- Analyze traffic patterns
- Educate customers
- Seasonal displays
- Review program
- Referral program
- Product placement
- Sampling
- In-store signage/point-of-purchase
- Product design
- Graphic elements
- End-cap displays

=== Out-of-store Marketing Tactics ===
Out-of-store marketing incorporates most traditional marketing channels, albeit those focused on a local area. From joining local business organizations, sponsoring local sports teams, co-marketing with neighboring stores, and more.

=== Online Marketing Tactics ===
Online marketing is an affordable way for local retailers to communicate and promote their business. Free methods of which are getting online reviews, maintaining accurate hours on online directories and social platforms, communicating/engaging with followers via social media, email and sms marketing, search engine optimization and more. Paid online marketing can involve local search marketing, local social marketing, geo-targeting, beacons, and other tactics.{
