= Watch strap =

Bracelet that straps a watch to the wrist

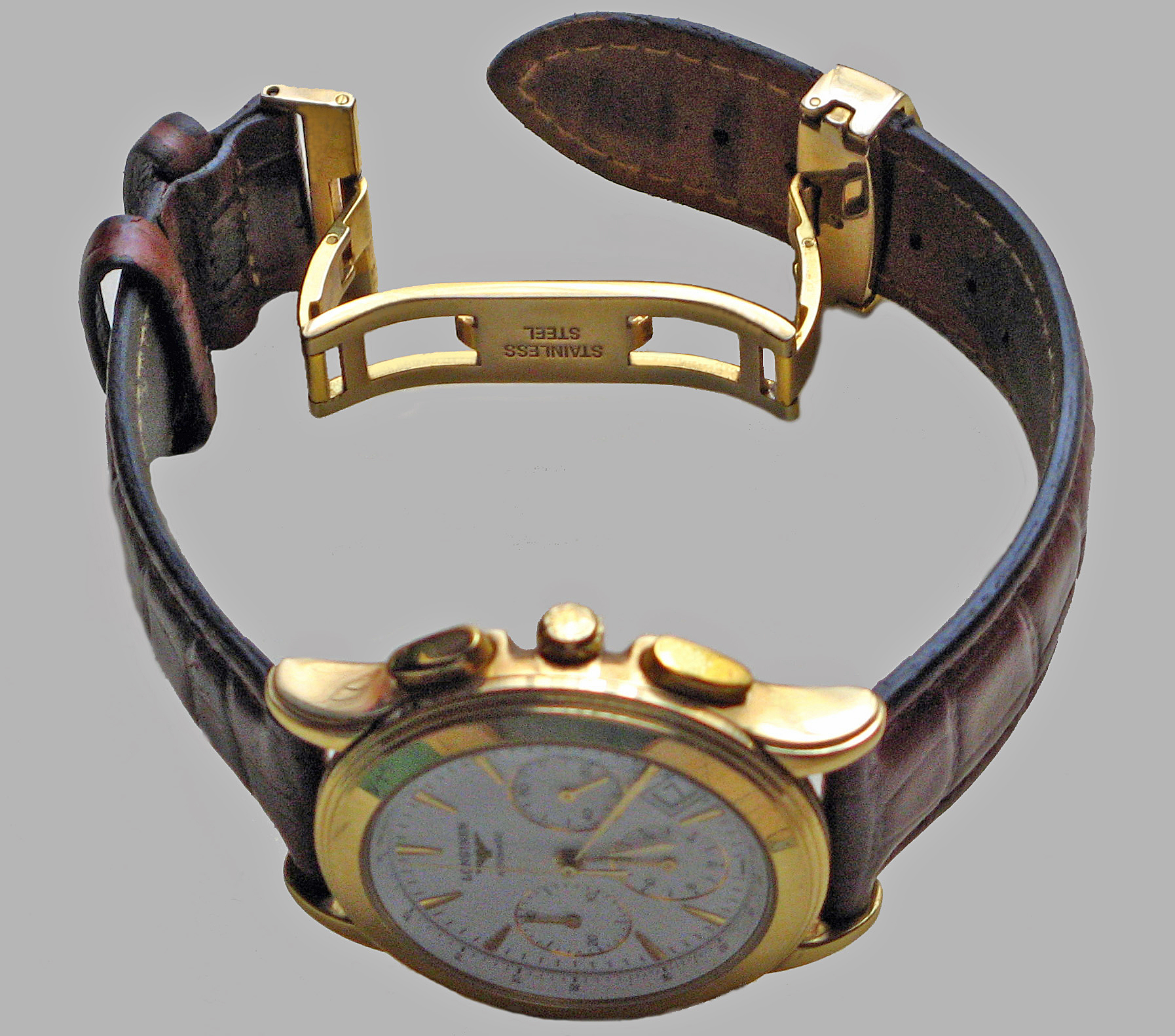
A leather watch strap with a butterfly closure

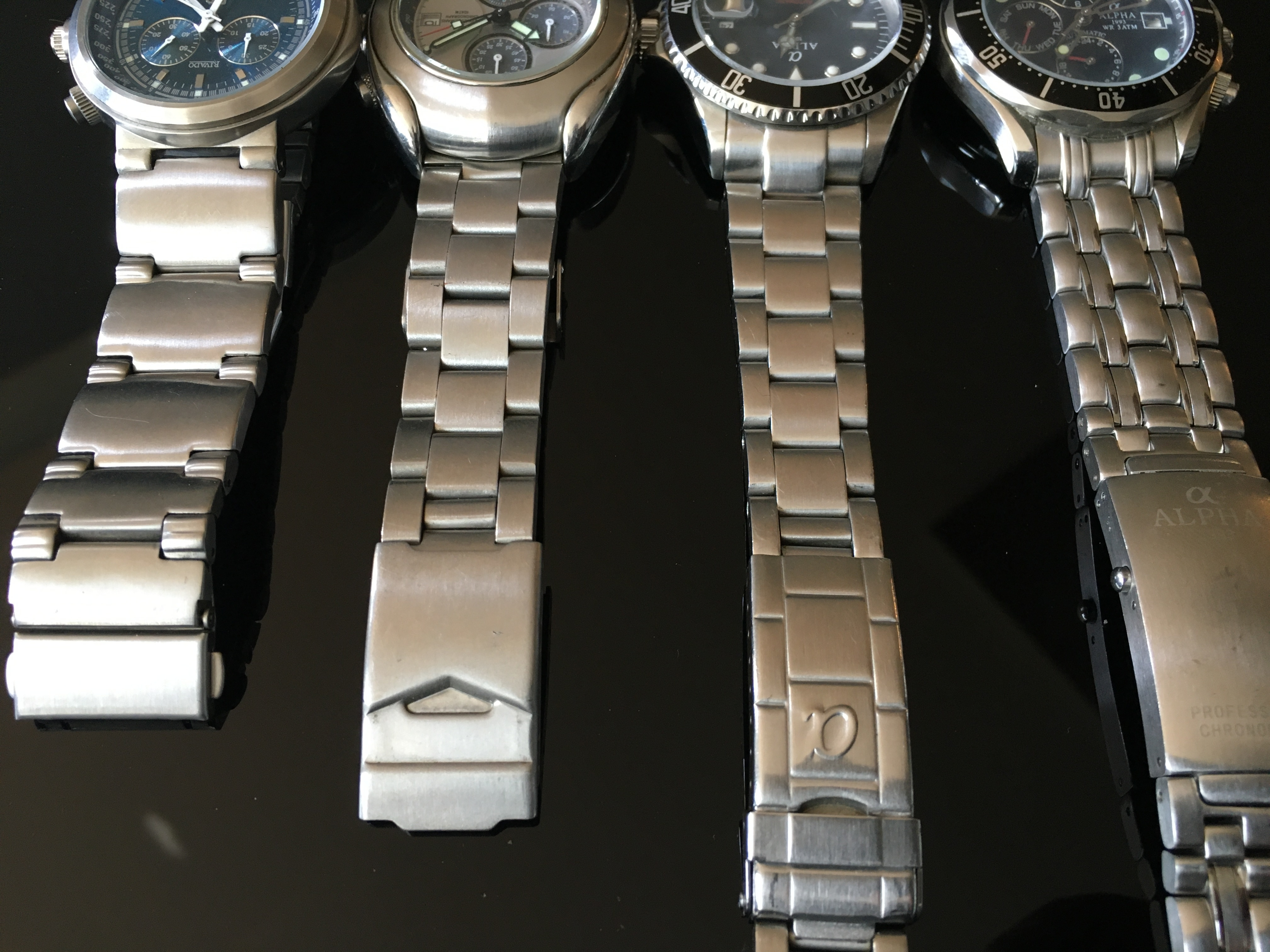
Four analog wristwatches for men with variants of the widespread metal watch strap made from stainless steel, the two in the middle being of the most common type

A watch strap, watch band, watch bracelet or watch belt is a bracelet that straps a wrist watch onto the wrist. Watch straps may be made of leather, plastic, polyurethane, silicone, rubber, FKM, cloth, or metal, sometimes in combination. It can be regarded as a fashion item, serving both a utilitarian and decorative function. Some metal watch straps may be plated with, or even in rare cases made of, precious metals.

== Types ==
Watch straps may close with a buckle or a folding clasp. Expanding watch straps are designed to expand elastically, often by the use of metal springs in a segmented design, and may be slipped on like a bracelet. Attachment points for the strap to the watch are largely standardized, with a spring bar (a spring-loaded double-ended pin) used to anchor the watch strap to holes in a bracket that is integral to the watch case, allowing worn watch straps to be replaced or swapped with new straps for fashion purposes.

Velcro watch straps (SEB 12100030 CF 55052-5 S/N 120) supplied by Omega Watch Co. and American Velcro Inc were first used for Project Mercury NASA space missions.

Metal watch straps are typically stainless steel. The most common metal watch strap styles are the folded link, pushpin, and screw-in styles.

A Bund strap are two leather watch straps with a separate piece of leather to sit on the wrist that serves the purpose of protecting the wearer's wrist from discomfort and pain caused by the extreme conditions in fighter and bomber aircraft cockpits. So, it acts as a protective layer between the skin and the metal watch.

Both metal watch cases and watch straps incorporating metal parts can sometimes cause contact dermatitis in susceptible individuals. Special anti-allergy watch straps, like a NATO style watch strap, which shield the skin from exposure to metal parts, are available for people with this type of dermatitis.

Specialist expanding watch straps exist for use with diving watches. The use of wet, or in some cases, dry suits requires the strap to expand in order to accommodate the added material, which increases the circumference of the wrist. Many watch straps intended for diving watches have rippled or vented sections near the attachment points on the watch case to facilitate the required flexibility to strap the watch around the bare wrist or around wet or dry suits.

Currently many straps use combined material to bring pros from both. For example, combined interlocking metal links with raised silicone contact surfaces and a broad magnetic snap closure. The stainless-steel gives the band a stronger technical profile, while the silicone offers comfort.

== NATO straps ==
NATO watch straps, also known as "NATO Straps" or "G10 straps", were developed by the UK Ministry of Defence (MoD) for wartime usage (DefStan 66-47 Issue 2 states the colour of the 20 mm wide nylon ribbon shall be to BS 4800 card number 3, reference 18B25, colour "Admiralty Grey"). It is a one-piece strap fed through the spring bars of the watch case, then slid into the appropriate notch and folded back to secure the excess strap and prevent it from sticking out of the main watch strap portion.

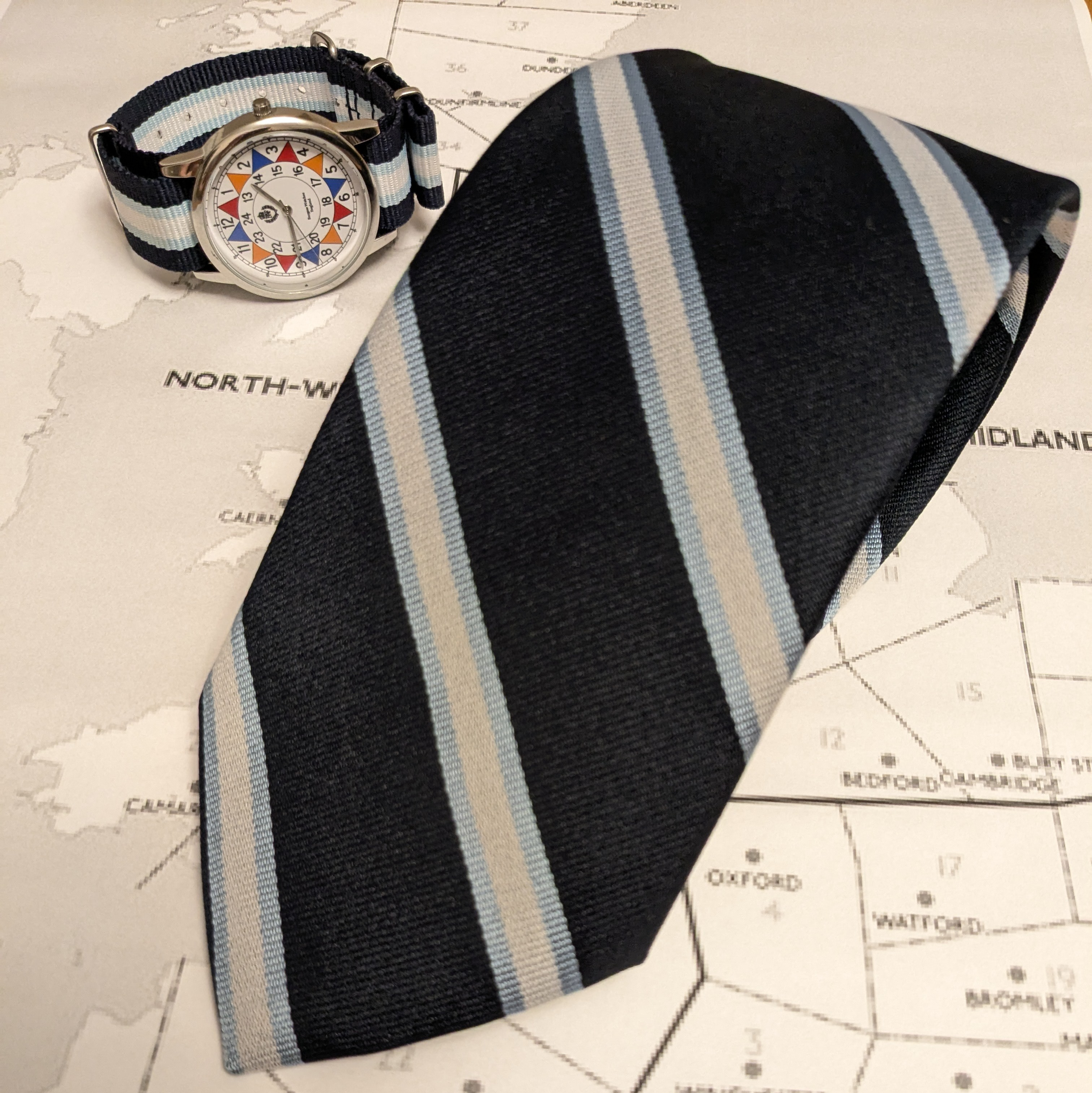
Royal Observer Corps tie with matching NATO strap on Sector clock themed wrist watch.

As the style gained popularity following its introduction in 1973, military personnel began to customize their watch straps, incorporating the colours of their regimental ties and/or stable belts, creating the colourful striped patterns NATO straps are known for.

The Zulu watch strap is a NATO watch strap adaptation using a thicker weave of fabric and more substantial metal hardware employing rounded loops and an oval-shaped buckle and both are typically made of nylon.

MN (Marine Nationale) straps are made from elastic and come with an adjustable buckle. They were originally intended for dive watches as they were designed to be easily removed from the wrist of a wetsuit.

Perlon straps, Marine Nationale straps, Zulu straps, and NATO straps go completely around the wrist, including behind the case. Other wrist strap styles allow the back of the watch case to directly contact the skin.

== Watch strap types ==
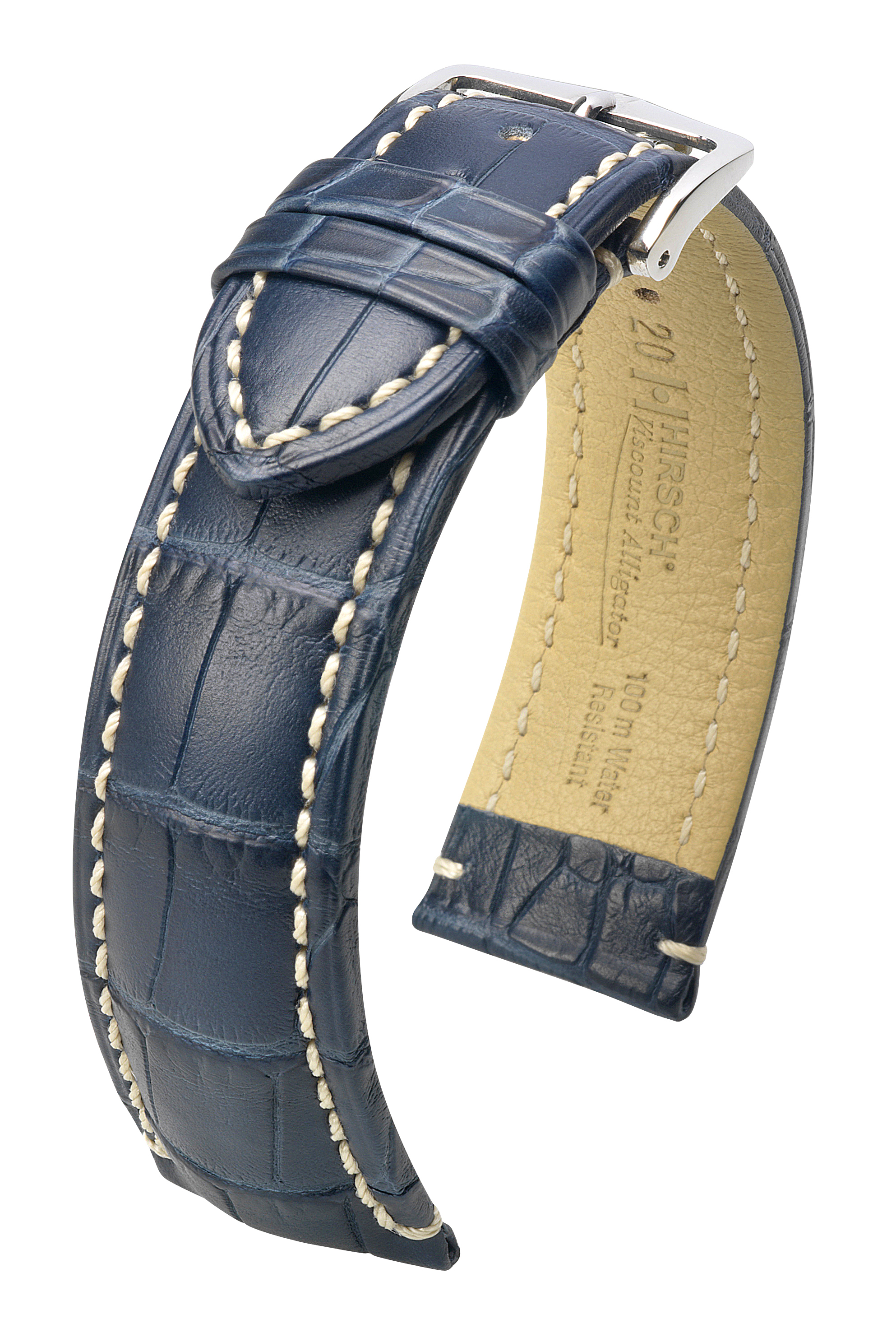
A leather watch strap.

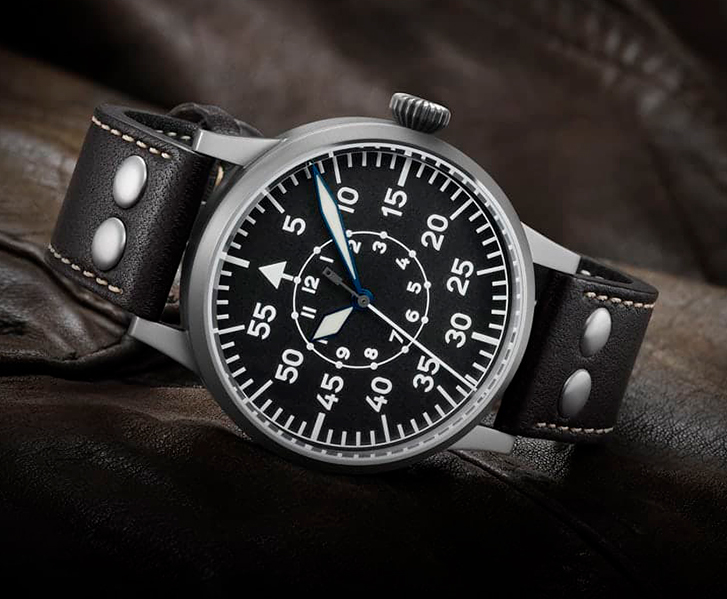
A leather strap on a Laco Flieger watch with origins dating to World War II.

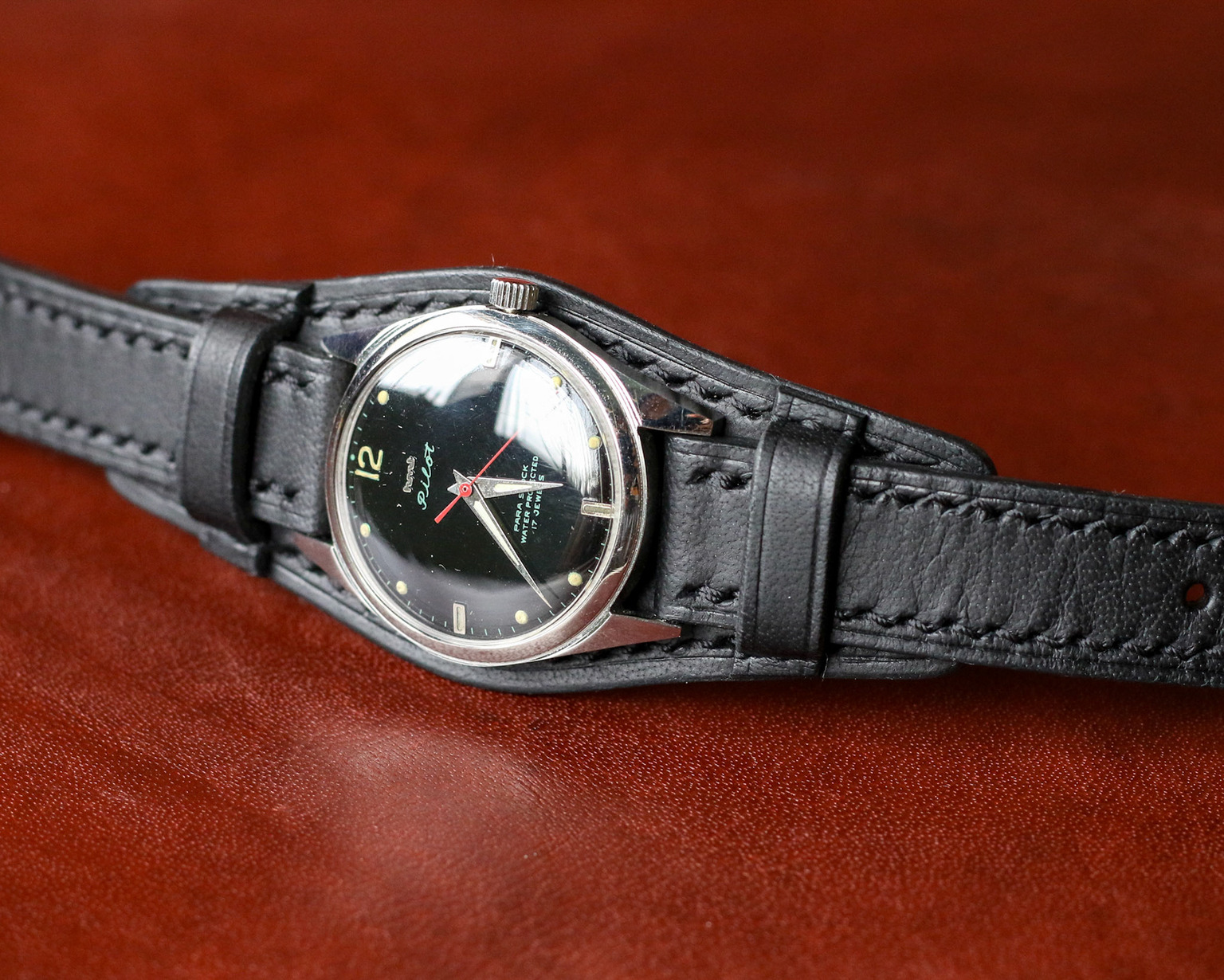
HMT Pilot watch on a custom leather bund strap.

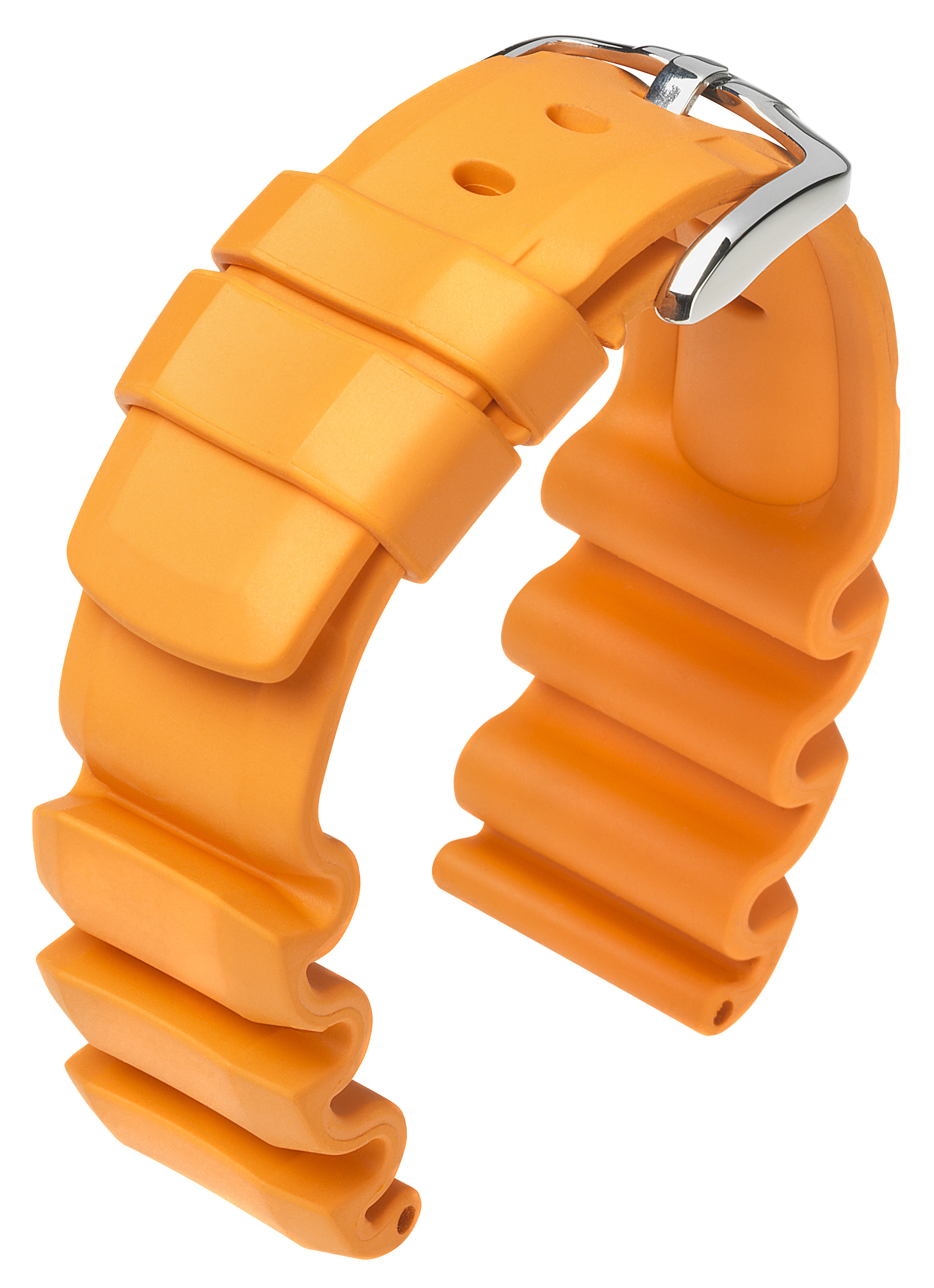
A specialist expanding rubber watch strap for diving watches.

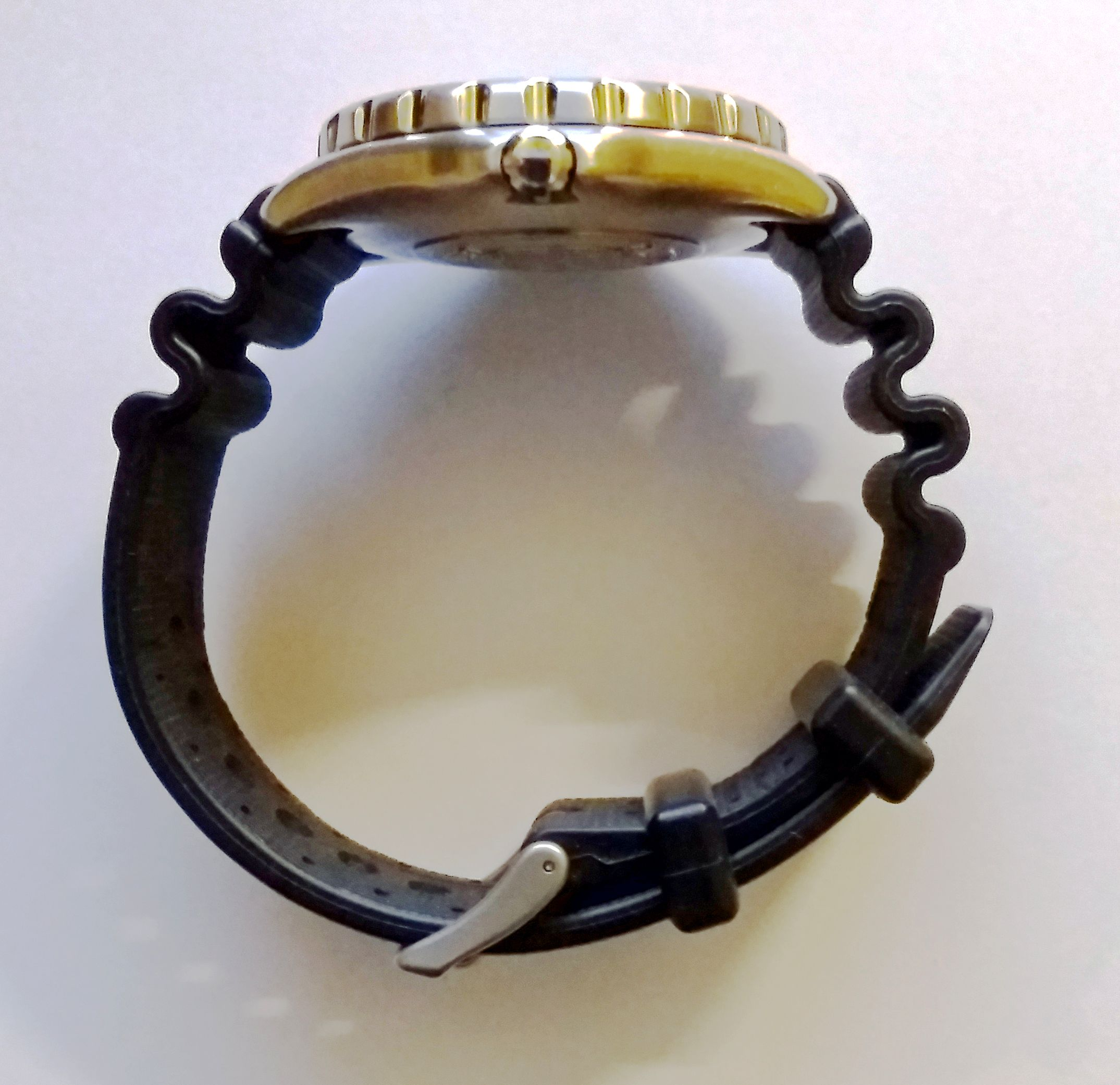
Polyurethane expanding watch strap on a diving watch.

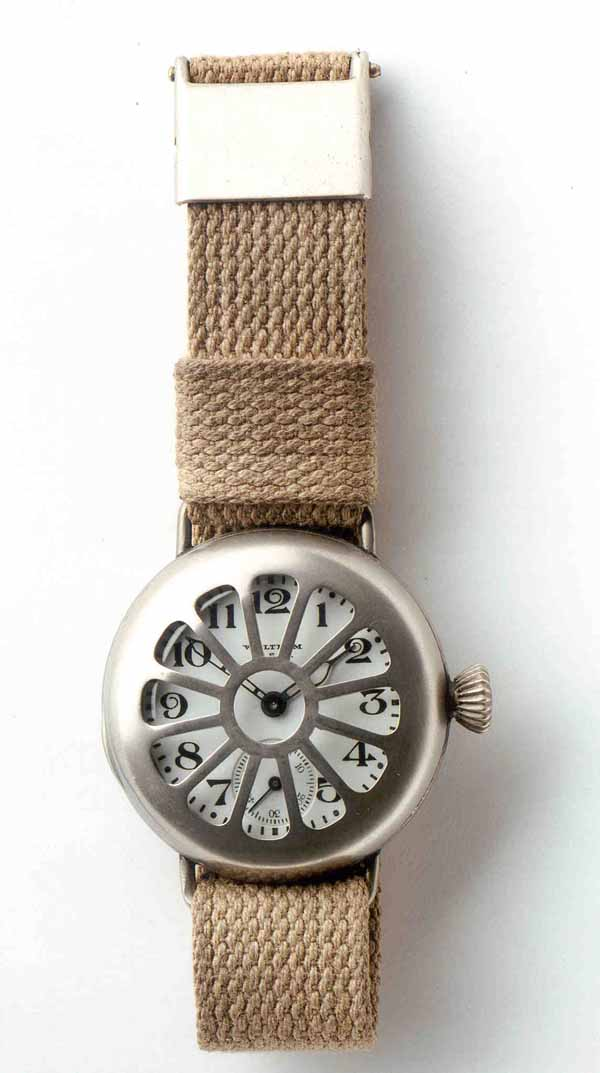
A cloth watch strap dating to World War I.

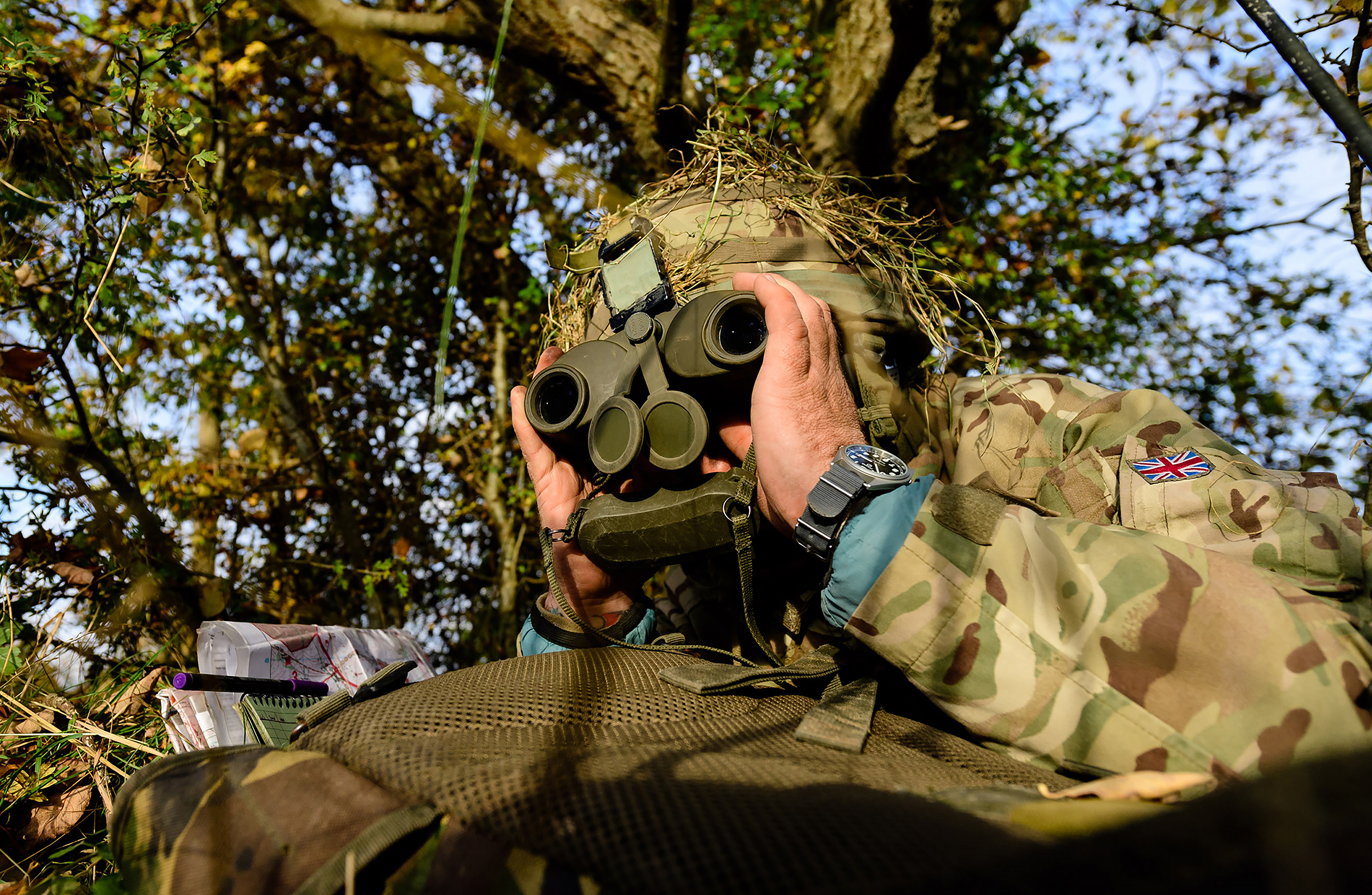
Dark admiralty grey coloured NATO strap worn by a British soldier.

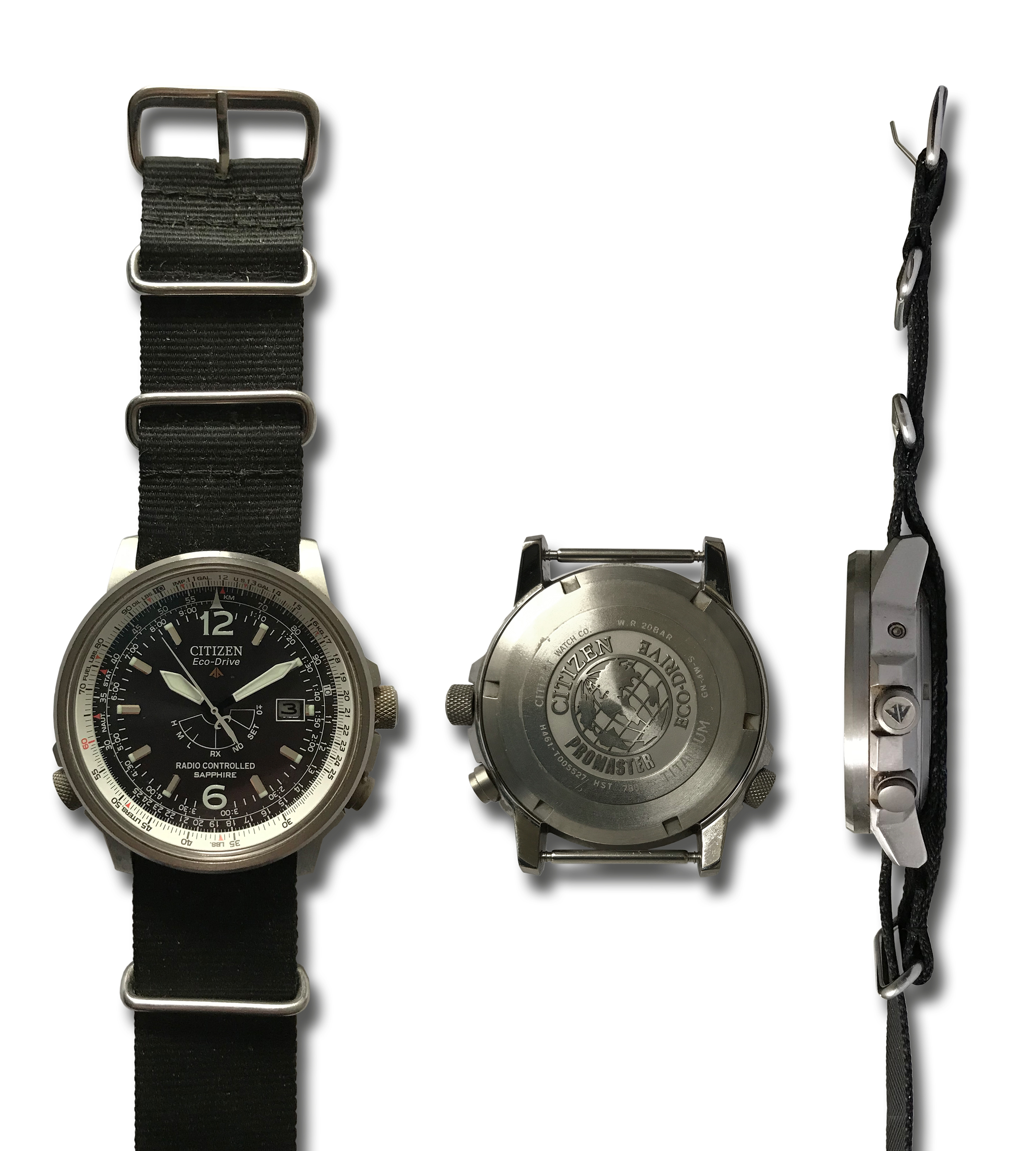
NATO-style webbing watch strap.

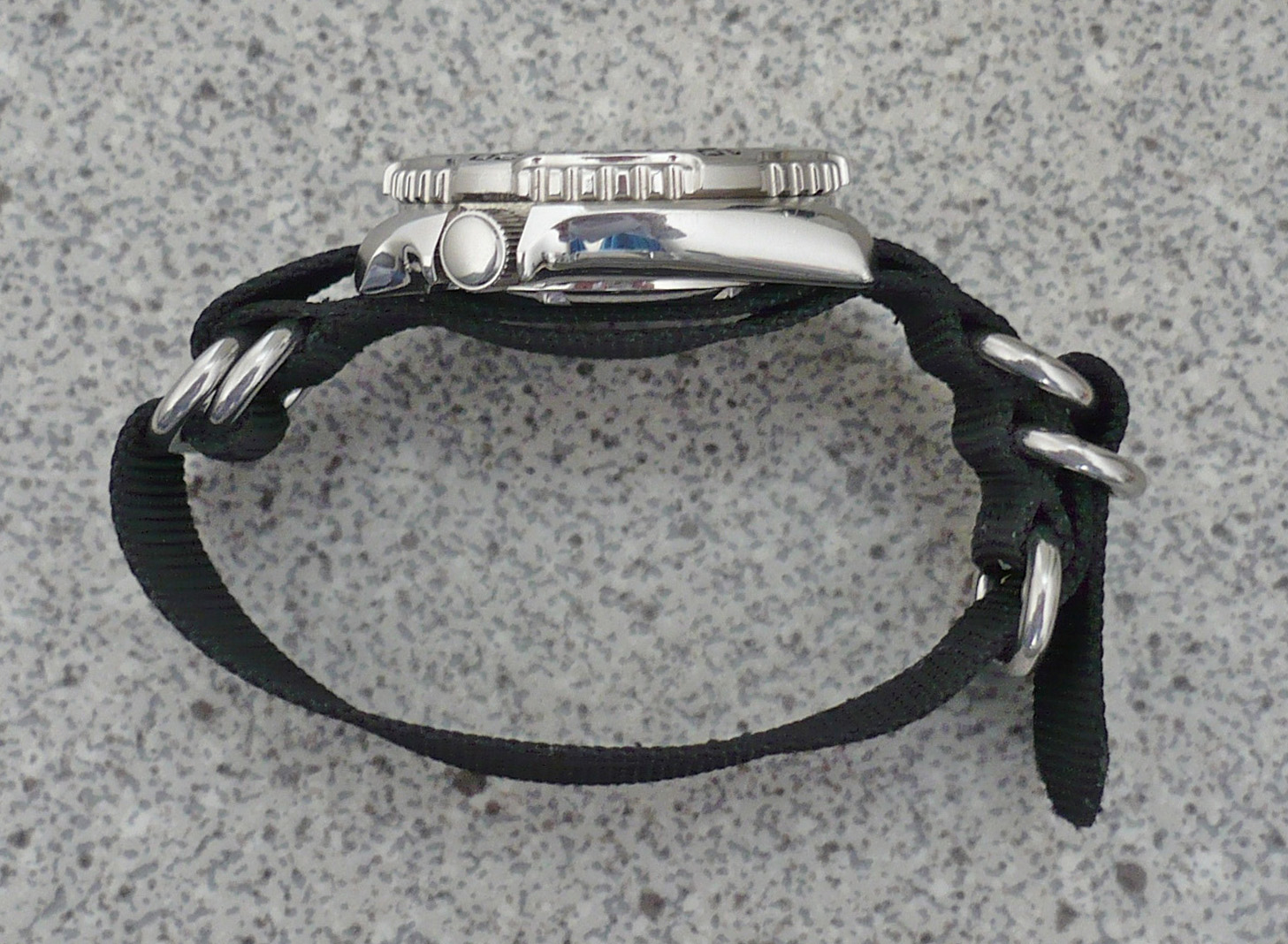
NATO-style webbing (5-ring ZULU) watch strap.

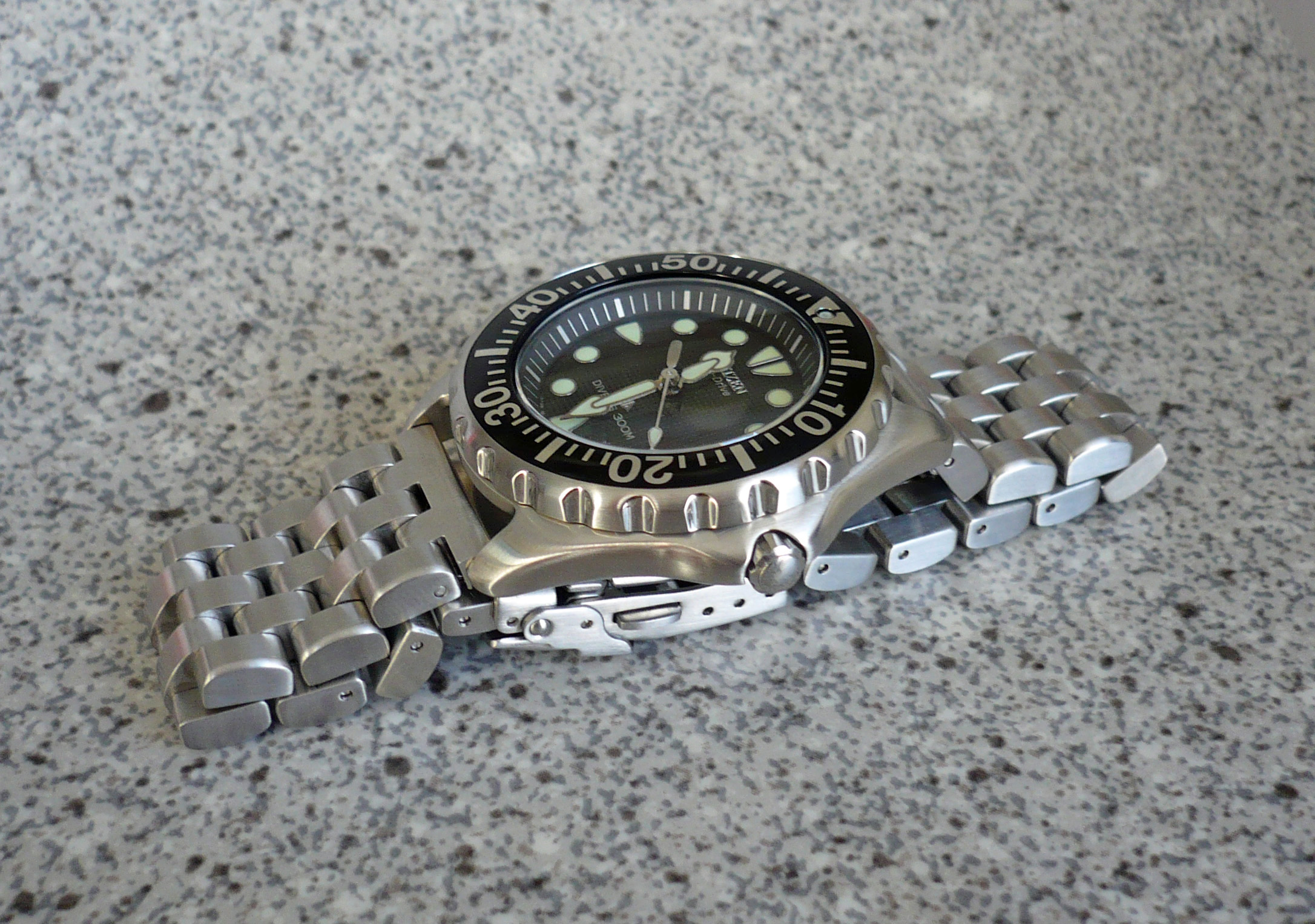
A watch with a segmented stainless steel watch bracelet.

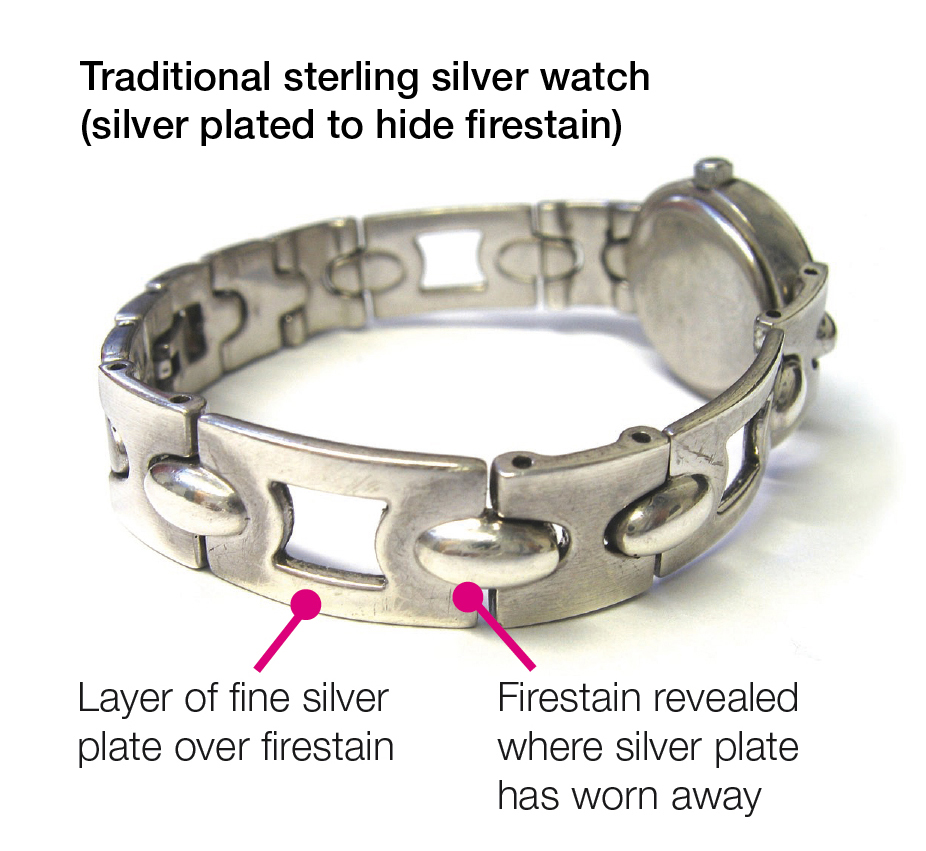
A silver-plated metal watch bracelet, showing signs of wear.

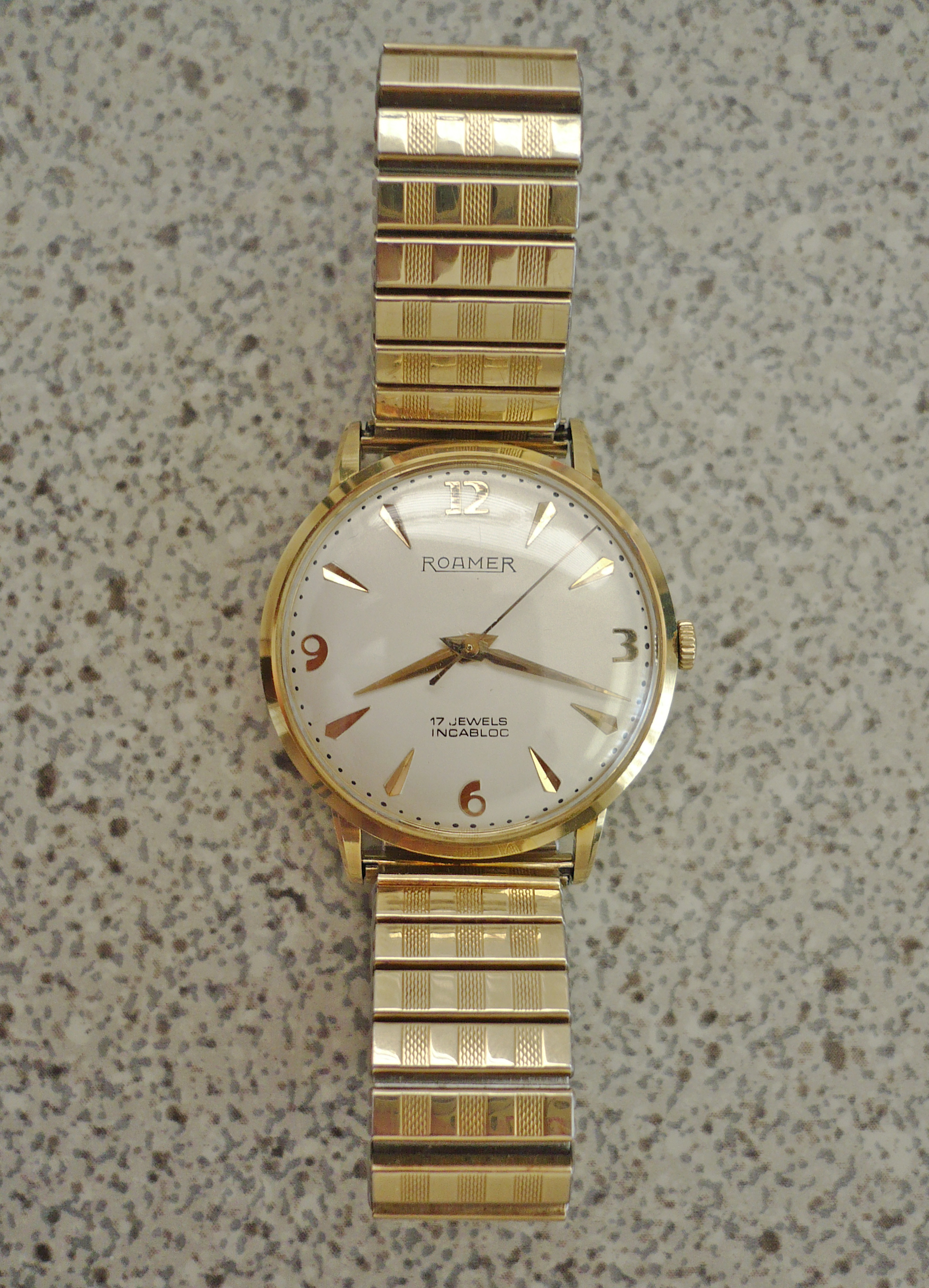
A watch with a gold-plated ROWI Fixoflex expandable/retractable elastic watch bracelet.

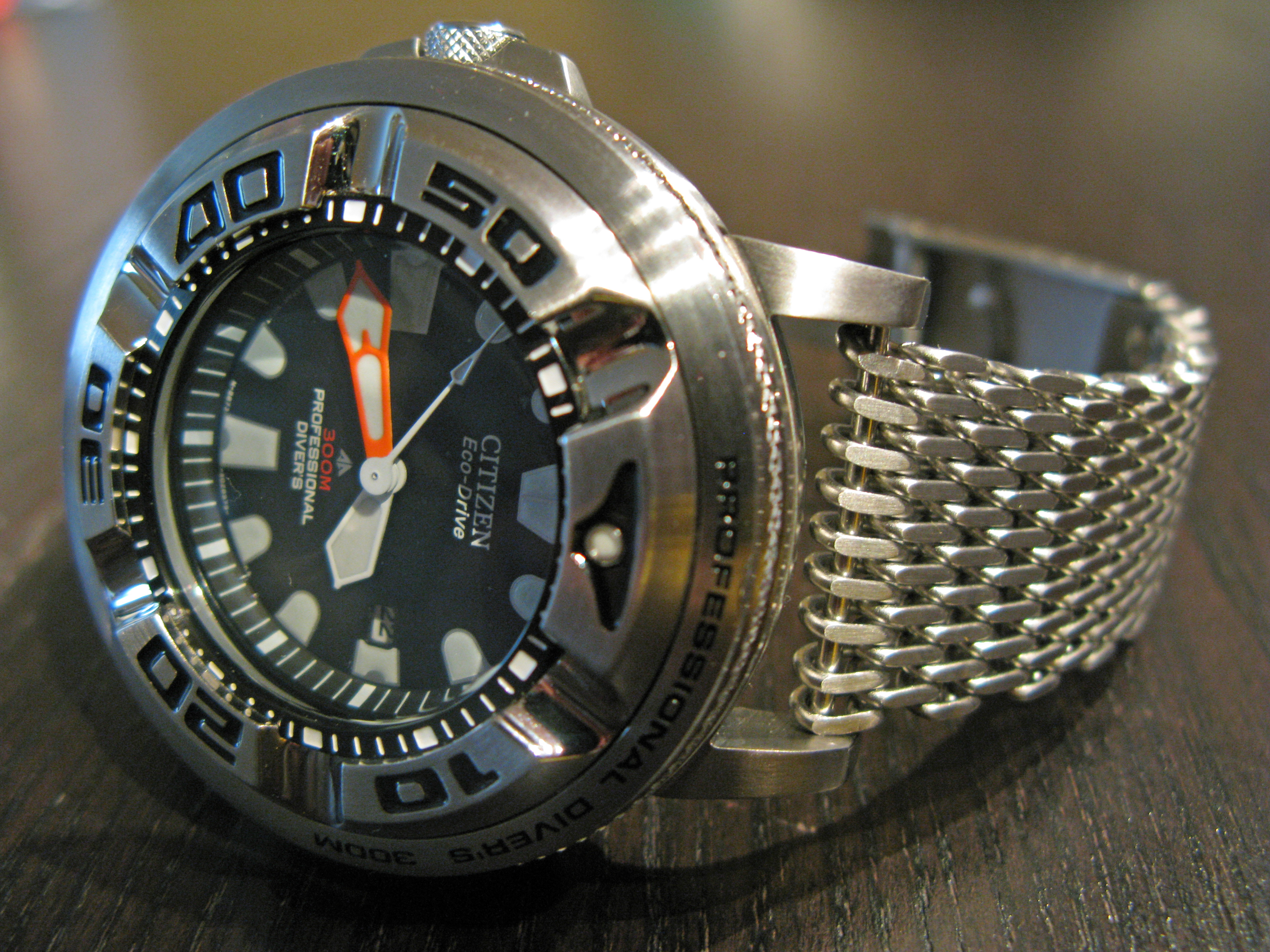
A watch with a stainless steel mesh bracelet.

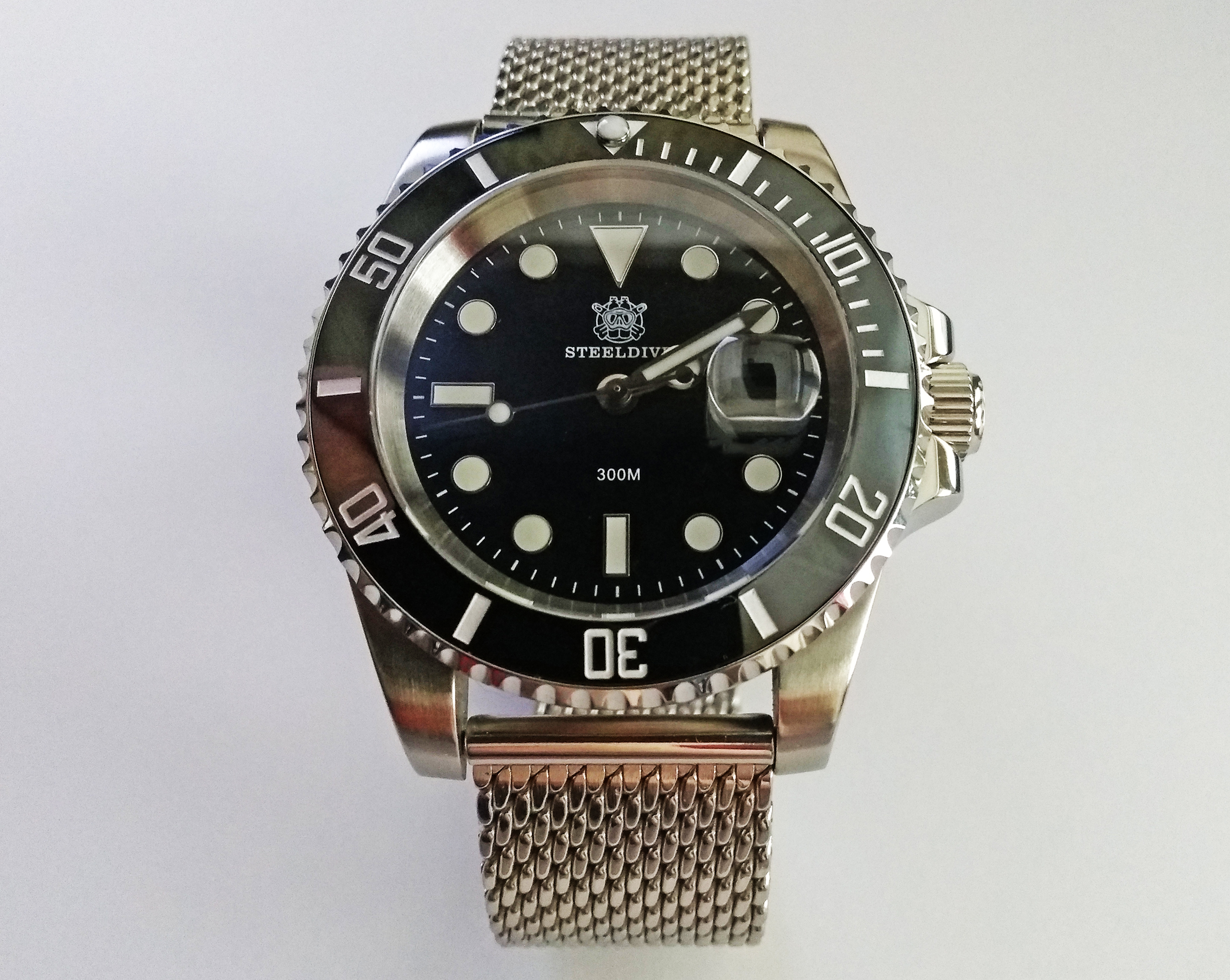
A watch with a stainless steel Milanese (braided mesh variant) bracelet.

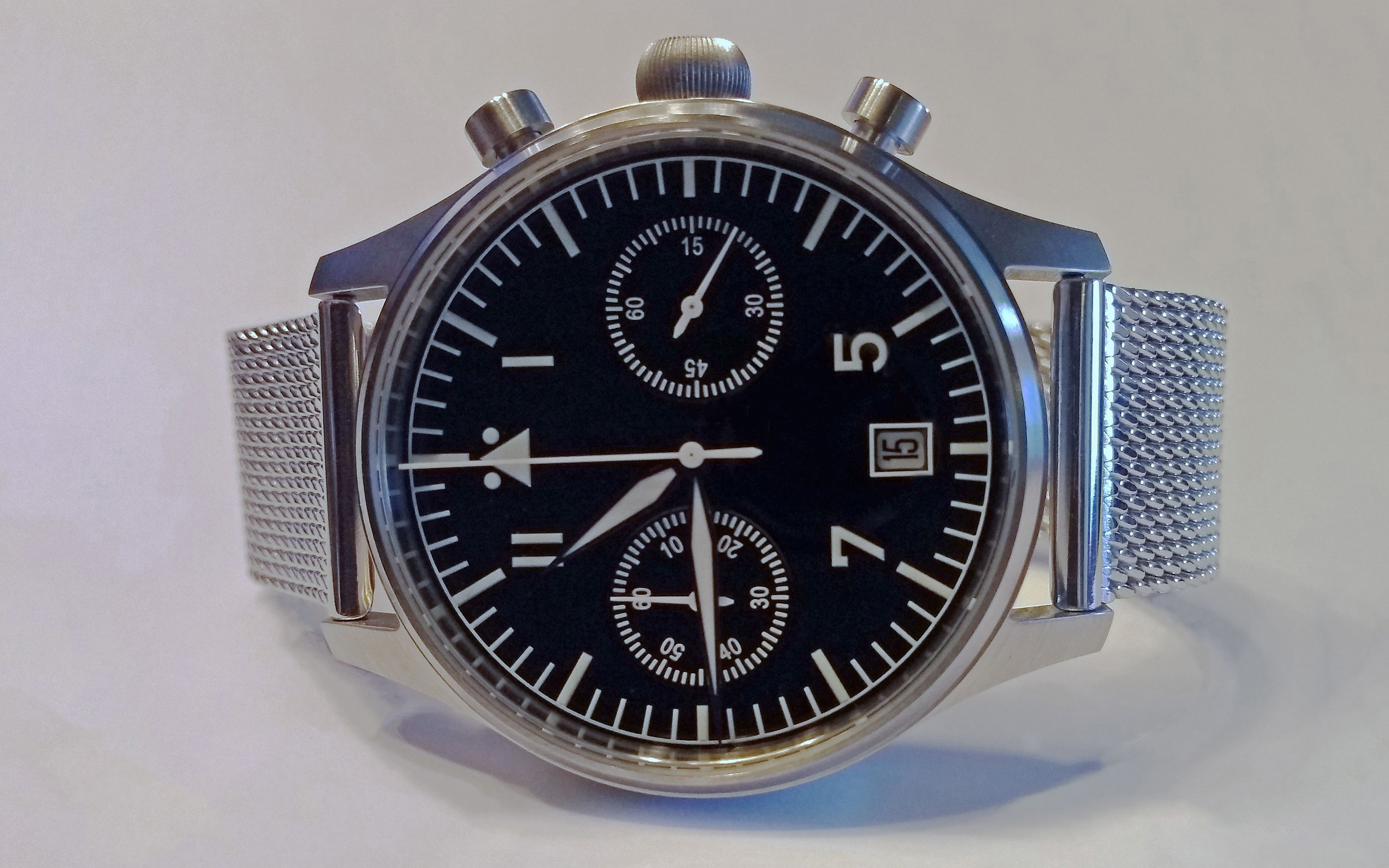
A watch with a stainless steel Milanese (braided mesh variant) bracelet.

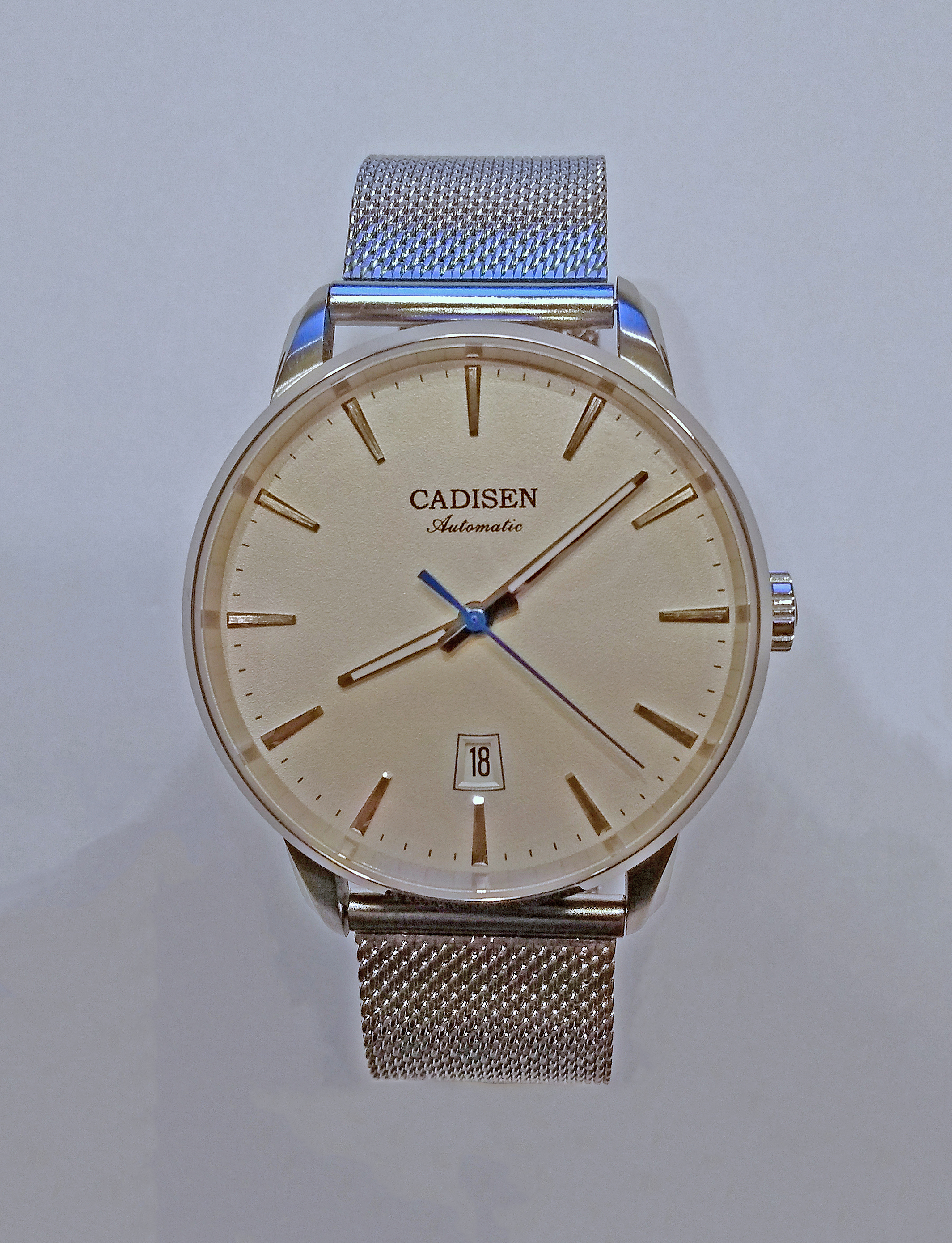
A watch with a fine stainless steel Milanese (dense and tight braided mesh variant) bracelet.

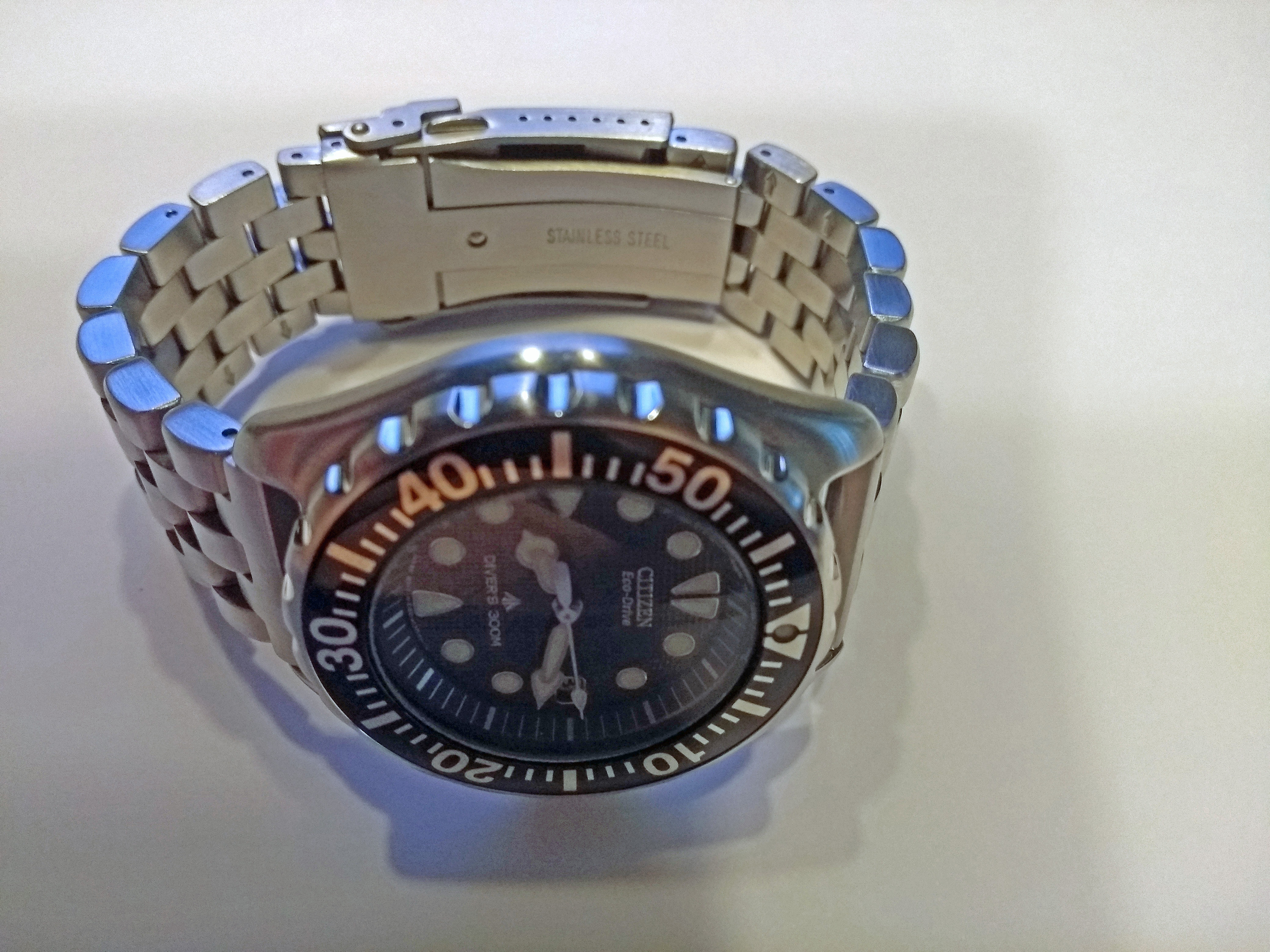
Stainless steel bracelet with closed deployant clasp featuring 6 micro adjustment holes.

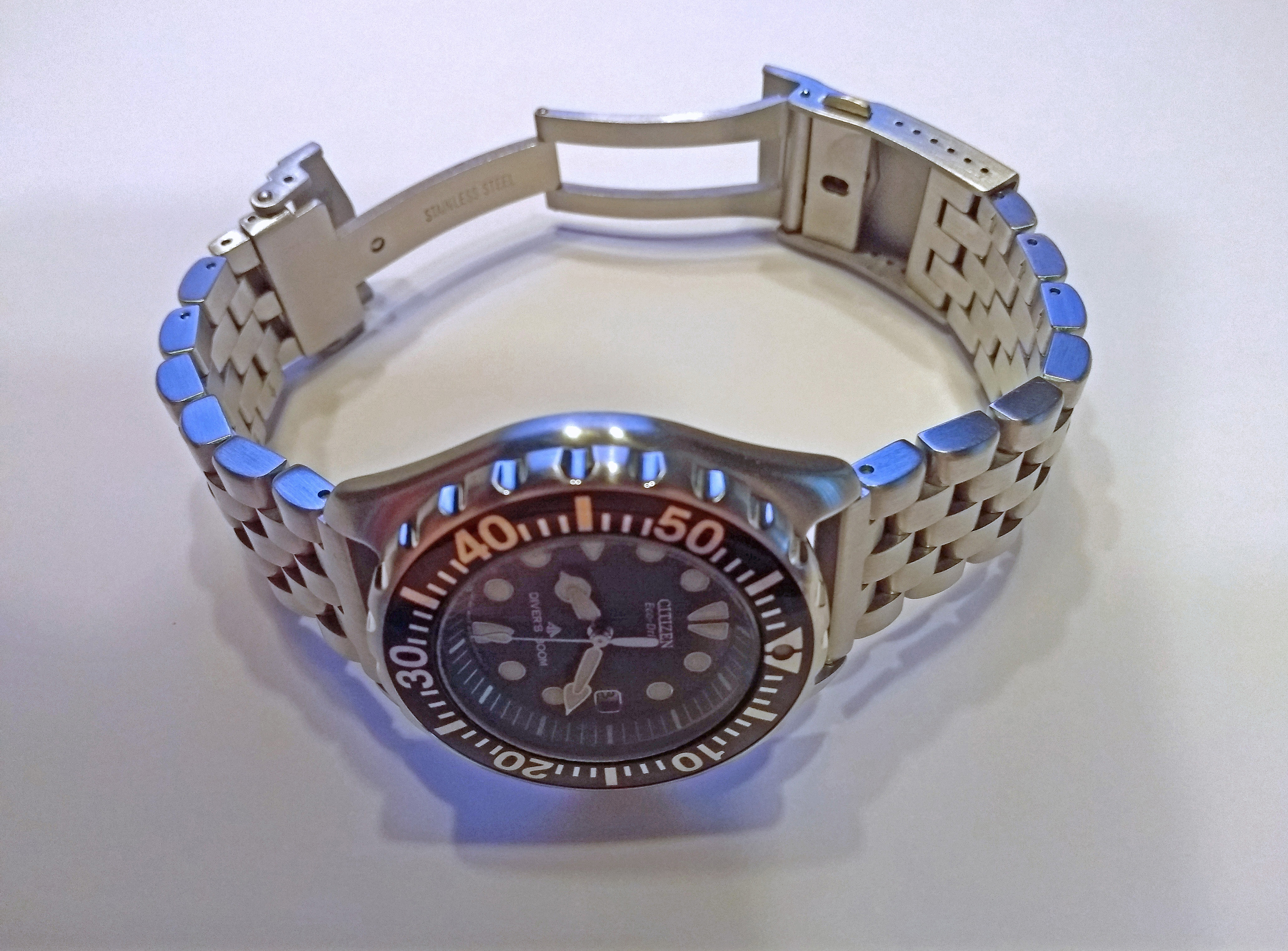
Stainless steel bracelet with opened deployant clasp.

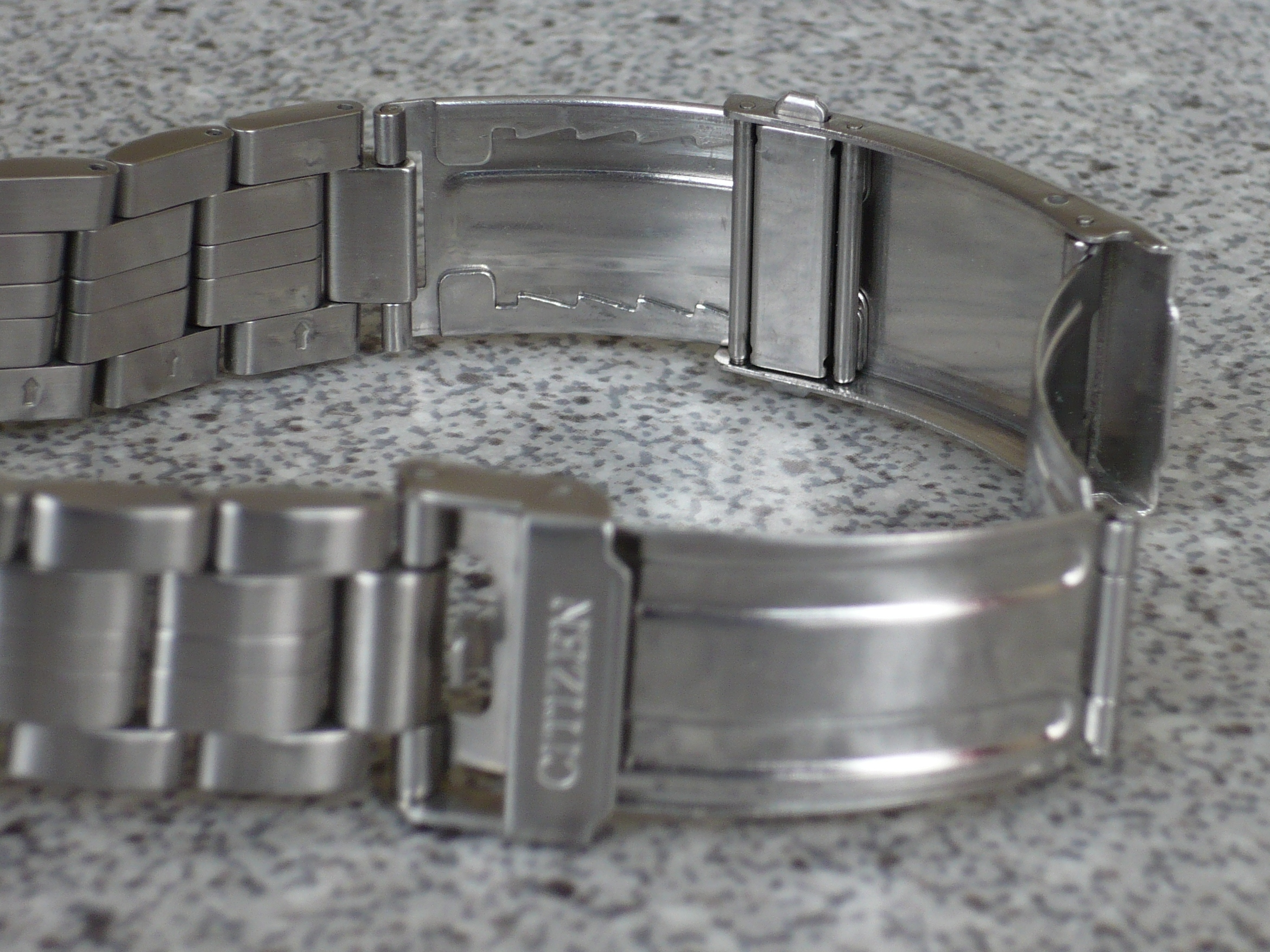
Stainless steel bracelet with deployant clasp and diver's extension.

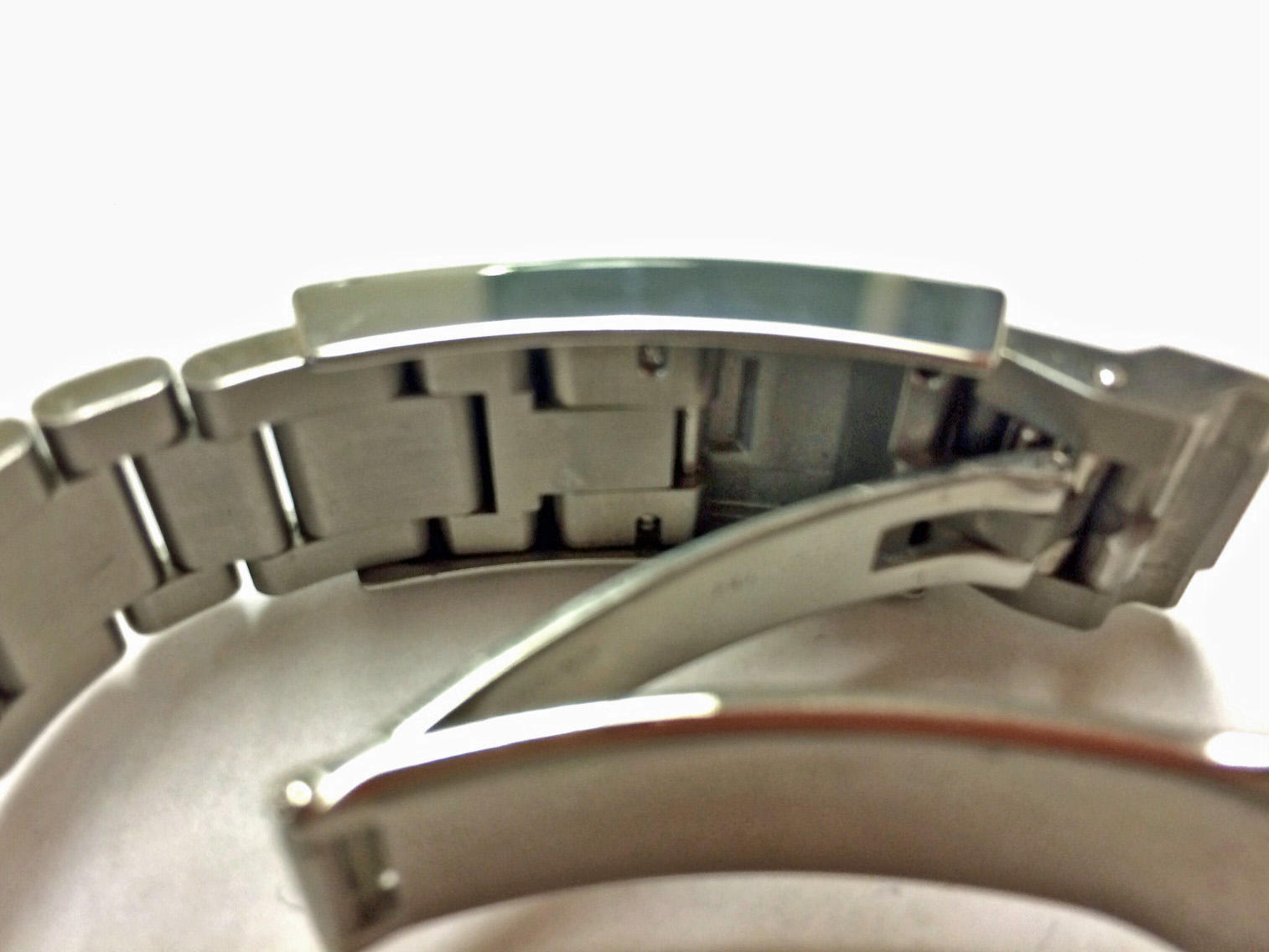
Rolex "Glidelock" micro adjustment deployant clasp for diving watches

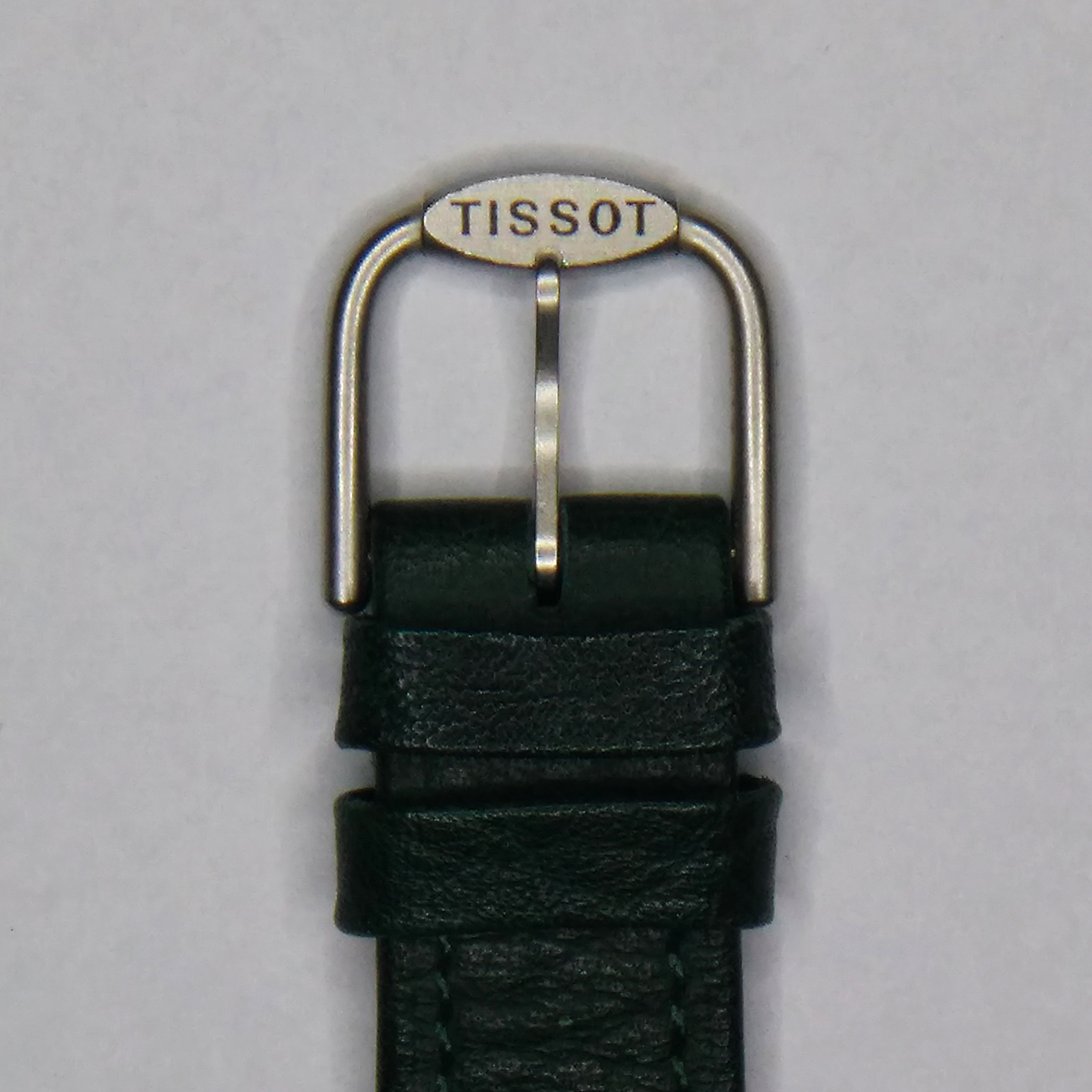
A buckle fastening for a leather watch strap.

== Clasps ==
A folding clasp or deployant clasp or deployant buckle is a device used to close a watch strap. (Butterfly clasps have a symmetrical appearance).

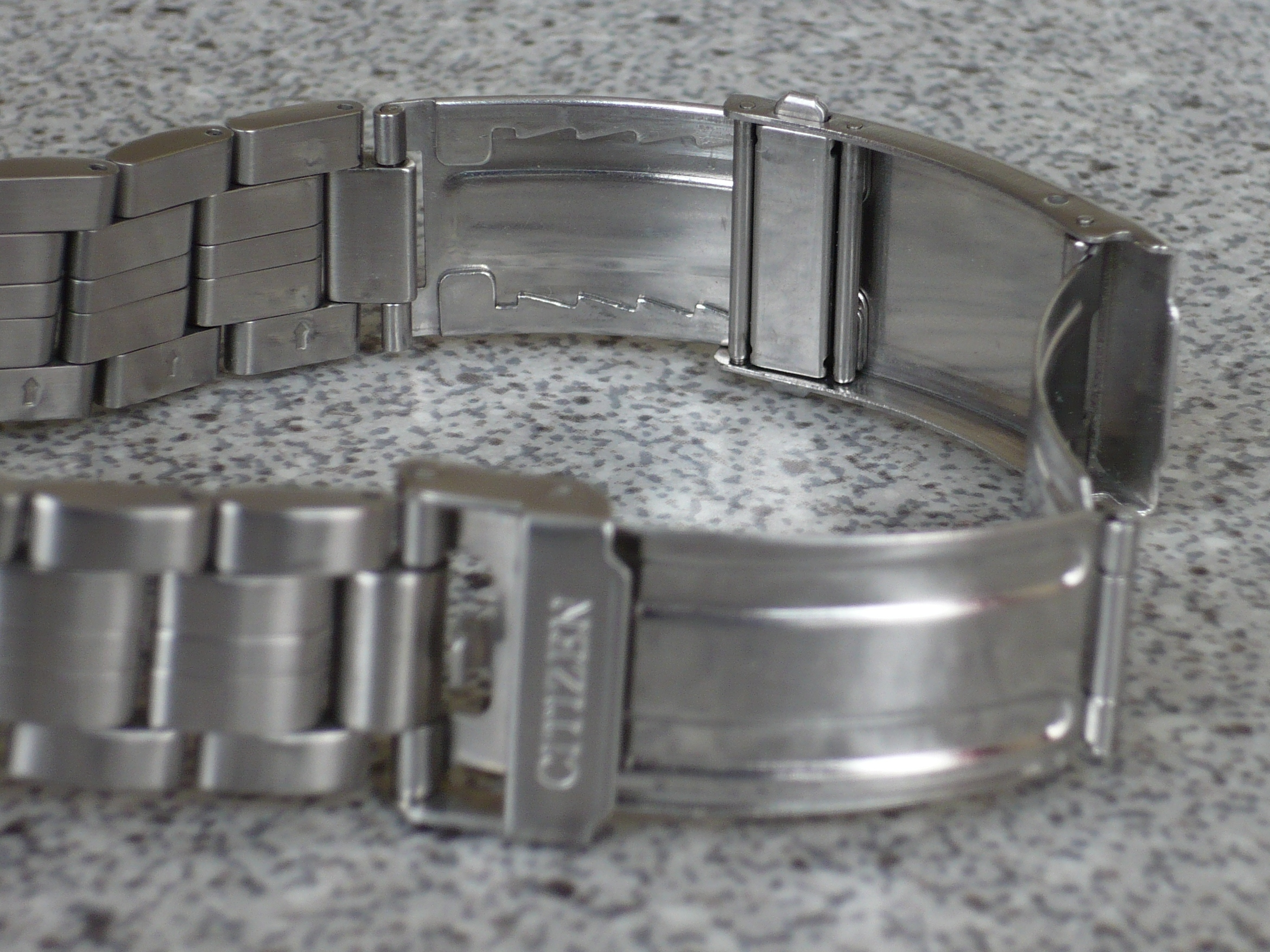
Stainless steel bracelet deployant clasp with divers extension

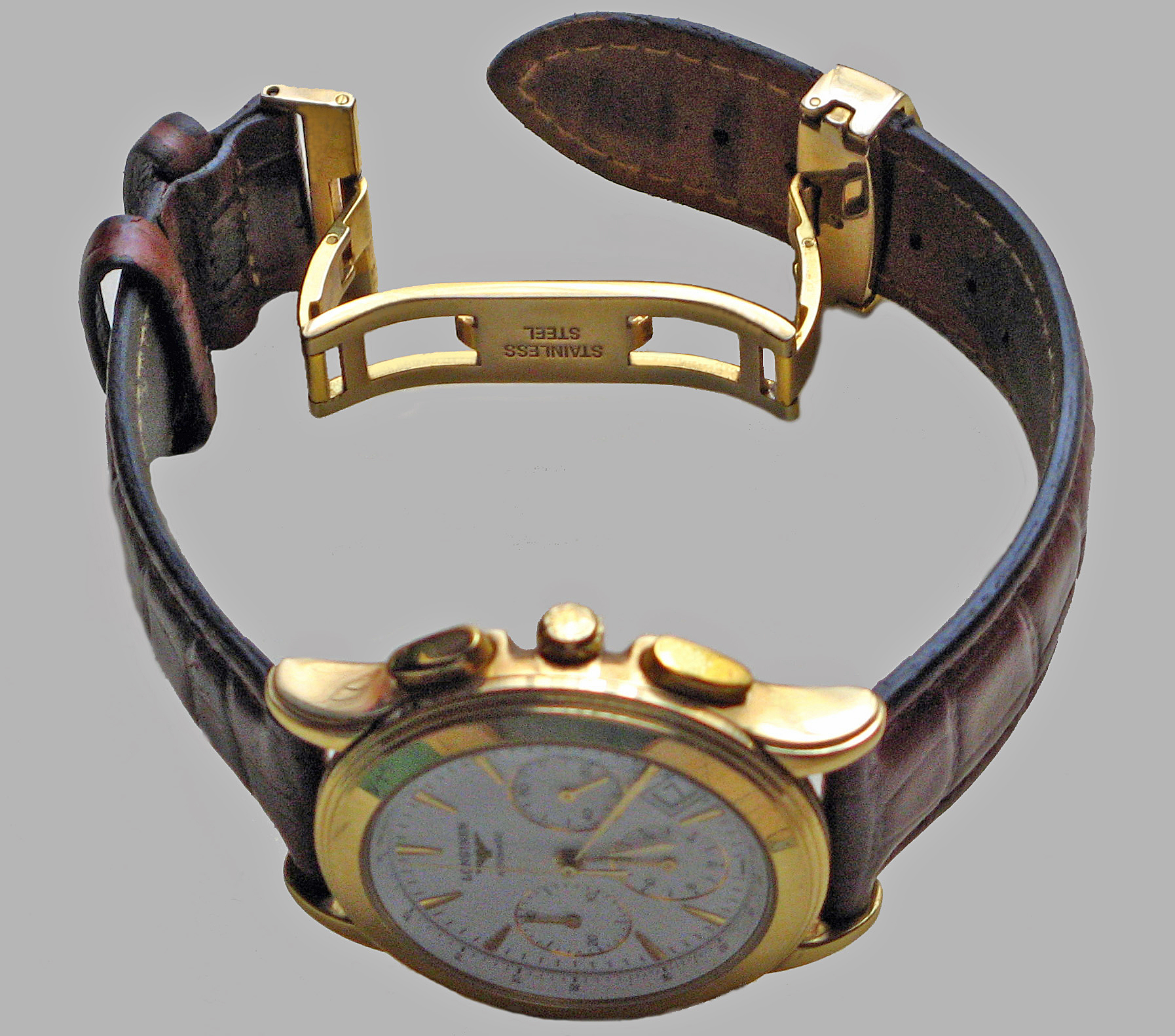
Leather watch strap with a butterfly clasp closure.

== See also ==
- List of watch manufacturers
- List of 24-hour watch brands
