= EVS Broadcast Equipment =

Belgian manufacturing company

EVS SA
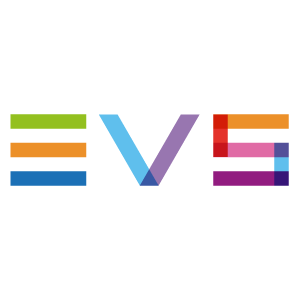
- EVS logo
- Type: Public
- Traded as: Euronext: EVS
- Industry: Broadcast Technology
- Founded: 1994
- Founder: Pierre L'hoest, Laurent Minguet
- Headquarters: Liège, Belgium
- Revenue: 131,400,000 € (2014)
- Number of employees: +600 (November 2023)
- Website: www.evs.com

EVS SA is a Belgian company that develops hardware and software products and services for live video production applications. The company counts over 600 employees worldwide.

== History ==
EVS was founded in 1994 by Pierre Lhoest and Laurent Minguet. Three years later, the company invested 30% of its capital in private funds, around EUR 4 million.

In 1998 EVS was listed for the first time on the stock exchange with an initial EUR 14.8 quotation per share (at comparable levels) and was valued at EUR 204 million. In that same year, EVS acquired VSE, a hardware subcontractor managed by Michel Counson. In that transaction, VSE received EVS shares for an approximate EUR 4.5 million value.

Since then, EVS has become a major broadcast actor, focusing on digital recording technologies for live sports TV production. EVS core products are primarily used in outbroadcasting vans (OB vans) and allow high-quality, respectively slow-motion image replay.

After establishing itself in outbroadcasting sports production, EVS started using its high-value services to address TV studio production with a full range of products in 2002. That strategic move contributed to a +40% uplift in 2012. Additionally, EVS founded XDC in 2004, a pioneer in high-definition cinema broadcasting, which was restructured within the Dcinex Group. EVS sold its stake in Dcinex in 2014.

In 2001 Laurent Minguet stepped down from his position as a director. Three years later, he gave up his position.

From his side, Pierre L'hoest decided to leave his role as a CEO and director following the board of directors meeting held on September 15 of 2011. In a transitional period, EVS was managed by its board of directors. Later CEOs include Joop Janssen (2012–2014), Muriel De Lathouwer (2015–2018), and Serge Van Herck (2019–present).

On 5 January 2015 EVS announced that it had acquired Scalable Video System GmbH (SVS), which IT-based vision mixers, and Dyvi Live SA (a company based in Brussels and distributing the products of SVS under the name DYVI).

On 18 July 2018, EVS announces, through the press, the end of the collaboration with Muriel De Lathouwer, replaced ad interim by Pierre De Muelenaere, chairman of the board of directors.

On 1 May 2020, EVS announced that it had acquired Axon, a leading broadcast and media network infrastructure specialist.

== Tapeless television production ==
Television networks have shifted from linear editing on tape to digital media or non-linear editing. The use of digital technology on hard disks has become the common alternative, replacing the use of video tape recorders. This transition to tapeless interoperable computer platforms began in the late 1990s, enabling television stations to store and edit prerecorded images more efficiently. Nowadays, video tape recorders are rarely used for live productions.

== Products ==
The EVS product range spans four main categories:

- Live video production, replays and highlights
- Asset management, distribution, monetization
- Real-time processing, routing and broadcast control
- Multi-camera review system for decision making

== Offices ==
EVS headquarters (administration, production and development) are located in Liège in Belgium.

EVS also has additional development centers located in:

- Toulouse (for OpenCube MXF products),
- Paris (for Epsio),
- Brussels (for MediArchive Director).
- Darmstadt (for Dyvi),
- Gilze (for Media Infrastructure),
