= Apache Brooklyn =

Distributed computing management software

- Apache Brooklyn logo
- Developers: Apache Software Foundation, Cloudsoft
- Initial release: April 2012; 14 years ago
- Stable release: 1.0.0 (March 2, 2020; 6 years ago) [±]
- Written in: Java, JavaScript, Groovy
- Operating system: Linux, macOS, Windows
- Type: Cloud computing, Orchestration
- License: Apache 2.0
- Website: brooklyn.apache.org
- Repository: github.com/apache/brooklyn

Apache Brooklyn is a framework that is used for modeling, deploying, and managing distributed applications defined using declarative YAML blueprints. The design is influenced by autonomic computing and promise theory, and implements the OASIS Cloud Application Management for Platforms (CAMP). It is free and open-source software released under an Apache 2.0 license.

== Apache Brooklyn blueprint ==
Brooklyn blueprint can define application topology, application topology component and cloud or non-cloud location.

== Related projects ==
Cloudsoft AMP expands on Apache Brooklyn and allows writing application blueprints in Topology and Orchestration Specification for Cloud Applications (TOSCA), and in CAMP.
