= CNF =

CNF may refer to:

- Carbon-neutral fuel
- Creative nonfiction
- Cloud-Native Network Function, emerging technology in cloud computing
- Belo Horizonte International Airport, Brazil, IATA code CNF
- Chomsky normal form, in formal language theory, first described by Noam Chomsky
- Configuration file, in computing, typically with file extension .cnf, .conf, .cfg, .cf, or .ini
- Conjunctive normal form, also known as clausal normal form, in Boolean logic
- Constant weight without fins, a freediving discipline in which usage of fins or change of ballast is prohibited

== Organizations ==
- Caucasus Nature Fund, a German non-profit supporting protected areas in Transcaucasia
- Club Nacional de Football, Uruguayan football team
- Comité National Français, a provisional government of Free France led by Charles de Gaulle
- Commonwealth Naval Forces, former name of the Royal Australian Navy
- Cornell NanoScale Science and Technology Facility, at Cornell University, member of the National Nanotechnology Coordinated Infrastructure

== Science ==
- Carbon nanofiber, cylindrical nanostructures with graphene layers
- Cellulose nanofibre, a type of nanocellulose
- Cytotoxic necrotising factor family, members of which are referred to as CNF followed by a number
- Cyanogen fluoride, a cyanide compound with the chemical formula CNF
