= SDD =

SDD may refer to:

== Computing ==
- Software Design Description (IEEE 1016–2009), a standard that specifies the form of the document used to specify system architecture and application design in a software-related project
- Software Design Document, a written outline of the development of a course or a description of a software product
- Solution Deployment Descriptor, a proposed OASIS standard for software deployment, configuration and maintenance
- Software Design and Development, an HSC subject in NSW that details the basics of designing and developing software applications
- Syntax-Directed Definition - a context-free grammar with attributes and rules
- Sentential Decision Diagram, a formalism in knowledge compilation and artificial intelligence
- Specification-driven development, a software engineering methodology

== Finances ==
- SDD, for SEPA Direct Debit, a payment system in the Single Euro Payments Area in Europe
- SDD, ISO code for the Sudanese dinar, the currency of Sudan 1992–2007, now replaced by the Sudanese pound

== Science ==
- Sulfadimidine, an antibiotic whose abbreviations include SDD
- Shared delusional disorder, a psychiatric syndrome
- Silicon drift detector, a p-n junction-based detector for ionizing radiation, such as for X-rays
- Seasonal deficit disorder, another name for seasonal affective disorder
- Symmetric diagonally dominant matrix systems in mathematics
- Selective decontamination of the digestive tract in medicine
