= David Webber (computer scientist) =

American computer scientist

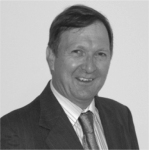
- Born: 1955; Leicestershire, England
- Education: University of Kent at Canterbury
- Occupation: Consultant
- Known for: XML/edi, XML; OASIS CAM, Schema, ebXML, Prolog
- Awards: ACM Senior Member Award
- Scientific career
- Fields: Information Semantics
- Workplaces: Government

David R.R. Webber (born 1955) is an Information technologist specializing in applications of XML, ebXML and EDI to standards-based information exchanges. He is a senior member of the ACM since 2007. David Webber is one of the originators of the ebXML initiative for global electronic business via the internet. He is holder of two U.S. Patents (5909570, 6418400) for electronic information exchange transformation and those patents are now cited widely by 37 other patents. David Webber has implemented several unique groundbreaking computer solutions in his career including the world's first airport gate scheduling system (King Khalid International Airport, Riyadh, 1987), the SeeMail email client for MCIMail written in Prolog, the patented GoXML system for XMLGlobal, the ShroudIt obfuscation system for LNK Corp, and the VisualScript tool for Smartdraw Inc.

More recently David has contributed to open XML standards development with OASIS as technical editor for BCM (Business Centric-Methodology), CAM (Content Assembly Mechanism) and EML (Election Markup Language) public standard specifications. Also the CAM work has included developing solutions for information exchange using the NIEM.gov approach NIEM. Contributions to the NIEM initiative include serving on the NIEM Technical Architecture Committee (NTAC) and with the IJIS Institute along with white papers and presentations.

== Biography ==
=== Education ===
He earned a Bachelor's degree in Physics with Computing from the University of Kent at Canterbury in 1976.

== EDI and ebXML ==
Webber participated in the development X12 Future Vision work in 1995 EDI, a focused group of 30+ people including with Edward A. Guilbert, the creator of the original technology. This led ultimately to the co-founding of the XML/edi Group in 1997 which Webber chaired the North American Chapter and then the group develop the principles of XML/edi document. Webber published "Introducing XML/EDI frameworks" in Electronic Markets Journal 1998; 8(1):38-41 which has been widely cited. From this early work the ebXML Initiative was jointly formed by UN/CEFACT and OASIS and co-sponsored by Sun, IBM, Oracle and others which led to the development of the ISO 15000 ebXML standard in 1999. Webber was a senior contributor to the international ebXML standards work for electronic business development. From this work stemmed the early work on the Content Assembly Mechanism (CAM) including the GUIDE concepts - Global Uniform Interoperable Data Exchange. Active in continuing XML standards development work within OASIS particularly he chairs the OASIS CAM technical committee, and co-edited the Business-Centric Methodology (BCM) specification. He contributes to several other areas of OASIS work including the Election Voter Services standard EML and the ebCORE work related to ebXML. Webber co-authored the book ebXML: The New Global Standard for Doing Business on the Internet (New Riders, ISBN 0-7357-1117-8, August 2001) with Alan Kotok . He holds two US software patents on XML and EDI technologies that have been widely referenced by 37 other patent applications from leading implementing companies such as IBM, Oracle Corporation, AT&T, GE, SAP, NEC and Dell. His current focus includes the field of voting systems and XML, contributing to the development of secure open source software solutions and open public standards (OASIS Election Markup Language). Webber was recognized as a Senior Member of the ACM in 2007 for his work and is a member of the NIEM Technical Architecture Committee (NTAC).

=== Further publications ===
David Webber is editor of the ebXML online news publication ebXML Forum and magazine. He is also widely published in technical publications of the computer industry on topics relating to the use of XML particularly for electronic business and information sharing. Recent examples include articles such as the Tech Journal and SOA Magazine. Further articles relating to rules technologies and XML can be found catalogued via the Articles NetMiner tool.

=== Projects ===
- CAM processor open source project - Webber is co-administrator along with Martin Roberts and Serge Leontiev - and the project provides tools for rapidly implementing interoperable information exchanges that support the NIEM and associated IEPD (Information Exchange Package Documentation) approach.
- Open voting solutions open source project was implemented by Webber as a reference implementation using the OASIS EML XML standard.

== Honors and memberships ==
Webber is recognized as a Senior Member of the American Computer Machinery Association, a member of and committee chair for the OASIS standards group, and co-founder of the XMLedi Group and North American chapter chair.

== Bibliography ==
- Kotok, Alan; Webber, David (August 2001). ebXML: The New Global Standard for Doing Business on the Internet (first ed.). New Riders. ISBN 0-7357-1117-8.

== See also ==
- ebXML, Content Assembly Mechanism (CAM)
