= EML =

EML or eml may refer to:

== Computing ==
- .eml, a file extension for email with MIME content
- Ecological Metadata Language
- Election Markup Language

== Other uses ==
- East Malling railway station, in England
- East Manchester Line, a tram line of the Manchester Metrolink
- Eating Media Lunch, a satirical New Zealand news show
- Eicher Motors, an Indian automobile engine manufacturer
- Electronic Music Laboratories, an American audio synthesizer manufacturer
- Electro-absorption modulator lasers, lasers integrated with the namesake semiconductor device
- EML Sidecars, a Dutch sidecarcross and quad manufacturer
- Environmental Measurements Laboratory of United States Department of Homeland Security
- Euro Marine Logistics, a Belgian shipping company
- Militärflugplatz Emmen, a Swiss military airfield
- Estonian Navy Ship (Estonian: Eesti Mereväe Laev), a ship prefix
- WHO Essential Medicines List
- eml, a deprecated ISO 639-3 code for the Emilian-Romagnol language
- Earth-Moon-Libration points are points of equilibrium for small-mass objects in the Earth-Moon system
- Electromagnetic levitation, a type of magnetic levitation which uses electromagnets.
