= David Webber =

David Webber may refer to:

- David Webber (computer scientist) (born 1955), British/American information technologist
- Mortimer Plumtree (David Webber, born 1969), American professional wrestling manager
- David H. Webber, American author and law professor
- David Webber (basketball) (born 1980), American basketball player

== See also ==
- David Weber (disambiguation)
- David Webb (disambiguation)
