= Ivane Kupradze =

- Ivane Kupradze
- Born: October 9, 1975
- Died: September 5, 2018 (aged 42); Borjomi-Kharagauli National Park
- Citizenship: Georgia
- Occupations: Ranger, lawyer
- Years active: 2001–2018
- Known for: Head of the Protection Division at Borjomi-Kharagauli National Park
- Awards: Order of Honor (posthumously, 2020)

Ivane (Vano) Kupradze (9 October 1975 – 5 September 2018) was a Georgian environmentalist, ranger and lawyer. From 2001, he served as head of the Protection Division at Borjomi-Kharagauli National Park. He died in 2018 in an accident while participating in efforts to extinguish a forest fire. In 2020, following his death, Georgian President Salome Zourabichvili posthumously awarded Kupradze the Order of Honor in recognition of his exceptional courage and dedication in the performance of his official duties. The president presented the award at the Orbeliani Palace, the presidential residence.

== Vano Kupradze Award ==
The Vano Kupradze Award is an award recognizing the work of rangers in Georgia. It is presented by the Caucasus Nature Fund (CNF), in cooperation with the Agency of Protected Areas of Georgia and partner organizations in the environmental sector. The award commemorates Vano Kupradze, head of the Protection Division at Borjomi-Kharagauli National Park, who died on 5 September 2018 while responding to a forest fire near the park.

The award recognizes exceptional dedication in responding to forest fires and other natural disasters. According to the Caucasus Nature Fund, annual awards for rangers and local community representatives in Georgia have been held since 2022. Candidates are nominated by the administrations of protected areas and protected landscapes, and the winners are selected by an independent evaluation committee.
