= Universal Core =

Universal Core (UCore) was a U.S. Government project to facilitate sharing of intelligence and related digital content across U.S. government systems. In a memorandum signed on 28 March 2013, the Department of Defense (DoD) Chief Information Officer (CIO) announced that DoD will adopt the National Information Exchange Model (NIEM) as the basis for its data exchange strategy in coordination with the NIEM Program Management Office (PMO). This DoD transition to NIEM will incorporate the ongoing efforts of DoD Universal Core (UCore) and Command and Control (C2) Core, effectively ending new development on these DoD data exchange models.

The information in this article is provided for reference and background information only.

== History ==
Universal Core is an XML-based information exchange specification and implementation profile which provides a framework for sharing the most commonly used data concepts of Who, What, When, and Where. The purpose of UCore is to improve information sharing by defining and exchanging a small number of important, universally understandable concepts between data-sharing communities, without requiring complex mediations. The specification is modeled with an extensible XML schema, a taxonomy of high-level entities and events to categorize the concept of What, and supporting documentation and extension strategies. The final released version is v3.0.

A key objective in creating UCore was to keep it simple, easy to explain, and easy to implement. UCore supports the National Information Sharing Strategy, a post-9/11 initiative. UCore is designed to permit "definable levels of interoperability" across user communities. To facilitate adoption, UCore looks to Communities of Interest, or knowledge domains, to encourage adoption of common vocabularies. UCore is not expected to replace complex data sharing within highly developed domains.

UCore traces its roots to several predecessor initiatives:

- Department of Defense Directive 8320.1, which proposed a very large data model for all DoD systems.
- Department of Defense Directive 8320.02 proposed to implement interoperability around communities of interest, and found success within those communities.
- UCore Version 1.0 was issued in October 2007 with an emphasis on sharing terrorism information and a different name. This release focused on exchanging data between Department of Defense (DoD) and the United States Intelligence Community. On 17 April 2008, a memo titled "Department of Defense and Intelligence Community Initial Release of Universal Core (UCore)" was distributed, cosigned by their respective CIOs.
- Cursor on Target is a simple exchange standard that is used to share information about targets. Its loosely coupled design led to multiple implementations and is used to facilitate interoperability of several systems with already fielded military software. Cursor on Target was originally developed by MITRE in 2002 in support of the U.S. Air Force Electronic Systems Center (ESC). Mitre first demonstrated Cursor on Target during a combined joint task force exercise in 2003, during which a Predator uncrewed aircraft was able to operate in coordination with crewed aircraft.
- UCore Version 2.0 was approved by ESC on 30 March 2009. This version added additional requirements from DoD, the Intelligence Community, Department of Justice, and the Department of Homeland Security. It incorporated concepts from Cursor on Target, and included cooperative agreements from participating agencies and communities of interest.
- The first annual conference on UCore was held on the MITRE Virginia campus in September 2009.

The Defense Information Systems Agency was the Technical Agent for UCore, working on behalf of the DoD Chief Information Officer (DoD CIO) to create and support UCore 3.0.

=== UCore 3.0 ===
UCore Version 3.0 was released on 14 April 2012 and contains modifications approved by the UCore Council and enacted by the UCore Technical Working Group. In this release, UCore is a set of reusable data components (RDCs) for the four interrogatives, an entity-to-entity relationship model, and supporting metadata types. These RDCs can be the foundational building blocks of a custom Community of Interest (COI) vocabulary or information exchange specification. Developers who reuse the designated UCore types are expected to gain a minimum level of understandability and interoperability.

UCore 3.0 also defines a message format for Situational Awareness (SA) messages, which report upon the time and location of entities and events, often with a focus on mapping or recording location history. An instance of this SA message format will contain components which reuse the RDCs; however, a COI can still construct message payloads with the RDCs without making use of the SA message format.

In October 2012, the Department of Defense elected to move towards adopting National Information Exchange Model (NIEM). This decision was formalized in a signed memorandum on 28 March 2013.

The released versions of UCore are expected to remain in place for as long as programs continue to use them, and may also support platforms that are somehow incompatible with NIEM.

== Standards Used ==
In addition to XML, UCore incorporated the following specifications and standards:

- Department of Defense Discovery Metadata Specification (DDMS). Existing DDMS global components are used to model some concepts in UCore.
- Intelligence Community Information Security Markings (IC ISM). These are used to identify the security level for data elements in documents and web services.
- Geographical Markup Language (GML) is an Open Geospatial Consortium XML grammar used to represent geospatial information. GML was adopted as ISO standard 19136:2007.
- Universal Lexical Exchange (ULEX) ULEX is a message framework originated by the Department of Justice which defines the message structure of a UCore message, including such concepts as a Digest, StructuredPayload, and RenderingInstructions. It was employed in UCore 2.0 but removed in UCore 3.0.
- W3C Web Ontology Language (OWL) Web ontology language is a widely used ontology standard endorsed by the World Wide Web Consortium. It is used to model the taxonomy of entities and events.
- United Nations Economic Commission for Europe (UNECE) Recommendation 20. Recommendation 20 is a standard for describing units of measure.

== Mandates and Recommendations ==
A joint 2008 DoD / ODNI Memorandum cited the availability of UCore's initial release. The Memorandum reinforced the connection between UCore and DoD 8320.2 "Data Sharing in a Net-Centric Department of Defense," and DoD 8320.2-G "Guidance for Implementing Net-Centric Data Sharing."

Within the Department of Defense, the Marine Corps explicitly mandated UCore for certain applications according to U.S. Marine Corps Order 5231.3.

While no OPNAV Instruction related to UCore was issued, the Navy accepted a role as DoD lead and served as overall co-lead for the federal effort. The Space and Naval Warfare Systems Command is providing engineering leadership for Navy UCore initiatives.

The March 2009 acceptance of UCore by the Air Force ESC suggested a level of commitment from that service.

A letter from U.S. Strategic Command (USSTRATCOM) to the UCore Executive Steering Committee cited USSTRATCOM's sponsorship of UCore from UCore 1.0 through a UCore pilot completed in 2006.

The Universal Core Working Group chartered in April 2007 included DoD lead representative Daniel Green. Green discussed the goals and challenges of the Group in a 2008 Masters thesis for the Naval Postgraduate School. While Green remained with the project through the release of UCore 2.0 in April 2009, the thesis offers additional insight into UCore tradeoffs, challenges to technical adoption, and strategies adopted to cultivate involvement of various intelligence agencies.

== UCore Semantic Layer (UCORE-SL) ==
UCORE-SL was an effort sponsored by the US Army Net-Centric Data Strategy Center of Excellence to augment the UCore Taxonomy with logical definitions for each term or relation defined within. This effort targeted UCore 2.0, which is now deprecated.

== External references ==
- Universal Core Community Website
- U.S. Intelligence Community Information Sharing Strategy, UCore.gov, 22 February 2008.
- Daconta, Michael. "UCore: The Twitter of Information Sharing", Government Computer News, 10 June 2009. (Archive.org version 2010 Jan 9)
- "Guidance for Implementing Net-Centric Data Sharing", Department of Defense Guide, Information Management Directorate Assistant Secretary of Defense for Networks and Information Integration, DoD CIO, 12 April 2006. Retrieved 28 September 2009.
- Smith, Barry et al. "Universal Core Semantic Layer", National Center for Ontological Research, University at Buffalo.
- Smith, Barry. "Universal Core Semantic Layer" Presentation, National Center for Ontological Research, University at Buffalo, 11 October 2009.
