= David Weber (disambiguation) =

David Weber (born 1952) is an American science fiction and fantasy author.

David Weber may also refer to:

- David Weber (clarinetist) (1913–2006), American classical clarinetist
- David J. Weber (1940–2010), American historian whose research focused on the history of the Southwestern U.S.
- David Ollier Weber (born 1938), American journalist and novelist
- David P. Weber, American whistleblower and former official at the U.S. Securities and Exchange Commission

== See also ==
- David Webber (disambiguation)
- Hermann David Weber (1823–1918), German physician and numismatist
