= NIEM conformance =

The National Information Exchange Model (NIEM) is the result of a collaborative effort by the United States Department of Justice and Department of Homeland Security to produce a set of common, well-defined data elements to be used for data exchange development and harmonization.

== Introduction ==
NIEM is a reference model. This means it is not a rigid standard that must be used exactly as it is in its entirety. NIEM was designed as a core set of building blocks that are used as a consistent baseline for creating exchange documents and transactions across government. While an XML Schema rendering of the entire model exists, it is not a requirement for NIEM conformance that this entire schema be used for validation. Nonetheless, there are several conformance requirements.

The goal of NIEM conformance is for the sender and receiver of information to share a common, unambiguous understanding of the meaning of that information. Conformance to NIEM ensures that a basic core set of information (the NIEM components) is well understood and carries the same consistent meaning across various communities. The result enables a level of interoperability to occur that would be unachievable with the proliferation of custom schemas and dictionaries.

These conformance rules serve as guidelines for any agency utilizing the NIEM to implement their information sharing exchanges. Grantees that are developing inter-agency XML-based exchanges must comply with the special condition language contained in the grant, and follow the associated NIEM implementation guidelines outlined below.

== Conformance rules ==
The rules for NIEM conformance are as follows:

1. Instances must validate against the set of NIEM reference schemas. Schemas conformant to the NIEM must import and reference the NIEM Schema namespace they need to use (NIEM Core, Justice, etc.) or a correct NIEM Schema subset. Note that importing the NIEM Justice Domain namespace will cascade to importing NIEM Core. Also, note that if an instance validates against a correct subset of the NIEM reference schemas, then it will validate against the NIEM reference schemas.
2. If the appropriate component (type, element, attribute, etc.) required for an IEPD exists in the NIEM, use that component. Do not create a duplicate component of one that already exists.
3. Be semantically consistent. Use NIEM components in accordance with their definitions. Do not use a NIEM element to encapsulate data other than what its definition describes.
4. Follow the Information Exchange Package Documentation (IEPD) Development Lifecycle as described in the IEPD Requirements and define all required artifacts at each step.
5. Adhere to the NIEM Naming and Design Rules (NDR) to ensure correct, consistent schema development.

== Assistance in developing NIEM-conformant schemas ==
Further guidance on the proper development of conformant exchange schemas is provided in part by the NIEM Concept of Operations (ConOps) and NIEM Naming and Design Rules. These concepts are still being developed as NIEM continues to grow and mature. For an example of how the Global Justice Information Sharing Initiative has developed a user guide for the Global Justice XML Data Model (GJXDM), and for links to all other information related to the justice-specific model, visit the Global Justice XML Data Model website.

In addition to document support, tools are also provided to help simplify conformance when developing exchanges. The NIEM Schema Subset Generation Tool (SSGT), along with others, is built to ensure conformant subsets and development without requiring implementers to have detailed knowledge of the formal Naming and Design Rules. Additionally tools such as the CAM toolkit can check schema for NDR conformance, compare to NIEM dictionary and report potential interoperability issues. The NIEM IEPD Lifecycle and other best practice models for developing exchanges take full advantage of these tools to help ensure consistent design and development.

== Additional remarks about conformance ==
Information Exchange Packages (IEPs) and the IEPDs that define them conform to the NIEM; systems do not. The way data is labeled or used in one system does not impact NIEM conformance. Conformance depends upon how data is packaged as XML for an information exchange to be shared between two or more systems.

Use of some components of the NIEM to exchange information with other agencies does not guarantee conformance to NIEM. Users should be careful to avoid violating conformance Rule 2, listed above. An information exchange either conforms to NIEM or it does not.

== Grant recipients ==
To support government-wide information sharing, all recipients of grants for projects implementing information exchange capabilities using XML technology are required to use the National Information Exchange Model (NIEM) in accordance with these Implementation Guidelines. Grantees are further required to assemble, register and make available without restriction all IEPDs and related artifacts generated as a result of the grant to the component registry. Assembly of NIEM IEPDs within the NIEM IEPD Tool is optional. However, NIEM IEPDs must be assembled in accordance with the (MPD) Specification as specified by the NIEM Program Management Office, and must be registered in the IEPD Clearinghouse.

Organizations not receiving federal funding to use NIEM are also encouraged to register their IEPDs in the IEPD Clearinghouse. This will facilitate interoperability of information systems and will enhance effective sharing of critical information.

== See also ==
- NIEMOpen, formerly known as the National Information Exchange Model
- Naming and Design Rules
