= Solution Deployment Descriptor =

XML-based standard

Solution Deployment Descriptor (SDD) is a standard XML-based schema defining a standardized way to express software installation characteristics required for lifecycle management in a multi-platform environment.

The SDD defines schema for two XML document types:

Package Descriptors
define characteristics of a package used to deploy a solution.
Deployment Descriptors
define characteristics of the content of a solution package, including the requirements that are relevant for creation, configuration, and maintenance of the solution content.

== See also ==
- Organization for the Advancement of Structured Information Standards
