= Content Assembly Mechanism =

Content Assembly Mechanism (CAM) is an XML-based standard for creating and managing information exchanges that are interoperable and deterministic descriptions of machine-processable information content flows into and out of XML structures. CAM is a product of the OASIS Content Assembly Technical Committee.

The CAM approach aligns with the National Information Exchange Model (NIEM) approach and assists with producing Information Exchange Package Documentation (IEPD).

The CAM-processor tools enable creation of realistic XML examples from XSD schema structure definitions. These XML samples simulate test cases for use in interoperability testing and determination of templates for use in actual business information exchanges. The CAM standard allows for simpler and more reliable interoperability for business information exchanges.

A broad range of OASIS standard definitions are now being documented, validated and enhanced using the CAM open source toolset and approach. To date these include EDXL, CIQ, and EML. CAM use is also extending to external industry groups such as PESC, MISMO, STAR Automotive, CAQH and then for government uses including stratML, LEXS and NIEM.

Each group faces the same challenges in promoting localizations of their overall standards in ways that can be quickly verified and adopted. Using CAM they are able to take their existing XSD schema work and rapidly develop localization templates, XML test cases, new subset schemas for use with web services and create re-usable want lists and content hints. In addition CAM templates are used to build domain dictionaries directly from the XSD schema definitions and then produce cross-reference spreadsheets for individual templates to the master dictionary definitions.

All these capabilities are aimed at improving the quality and speed of implementation and interoperability using business information exchanges based on XML.

== History of CAM ==
The OASIS Content Assembly Technical Committee (CAM TC), which met for the first time in January 2003, was chartered "to produce a specification of a generalized mechanism in XML whereby implementers can deliver the means to bring together business process context and the localized implementation business rules needed to take a raw industry standard schema instance and combine that with actual business information content, context and roles and produce a valid consistent XML document instance."

OASIS is developing specifications for business process mechanisms, industry standard schemas, registry systems, and schema mechanisms. The CAM specification will allow these four components to be brought together in a consistent and standard way and publish assembly implementation instructions based on these OASIS specifications. This will facilitate the work of industry groups and allow development of software tools that work consistently with all these specifications.

The original work predating CAM was begun in the later days of the ebXML initiative as an offshoot of the ebXML Registry work. This working group was dubbed "BRIM" – Business Registry Interface Model and the focus was Registry content assembly services and content syntax storage specifications link to BRIM reference at CEFACT. In addition the BRIM work was also positioned to enable core component message assembly (CCMA) for business processes. The work was moved into OASIS at the end of 2002 to better facilitate the necessary XML development.

Implementations and deployments of CAM V1.1 are in progress as of this writing (January-2009) including open source solutions using Java and XSLT.

== Versions of CAM ==
- CAM 1.1 was adopted as an OASIS Standard in June 2007.
- Current work is continuing on refining and extending toward a new V1.5 release in 2009 mainly focusing on clarifications, corrections and limited extensions. The core role of CAM remains the same – defining, composing and validating XML content.

The CAM template syntax for scripting is designed to be obvious, human readable and declarative.

== CAM building blocks ==
CAM is built upon a number of existing standards:

Extensible Markup Language (XML)
CAM templates are expressed in a standardized XML
XML Schema
CAM provides an abstraction layer for XSD schema that makes manipulating and defining business information exchange templates significantly easier than using just XSD schema alone XML Schema.
XPath V2.0
CAM uses XPath extensively for defining rules and path target expressions that are at the heart of the CAM validator processing.
XSLT scripting
the existing open source solutions leverage XSLT extensively.
electronic business XML(ebXML)
core components and registry concepts developed for ebXML (ISO15000) provide significant conceptual foundations to the CAM approach to content assembly.

=== CAM templates ===
A CAM template consists of four core sections. The header section, the structure section, and business rules section and the extensions section.

These can be summarized in XML syntax as:

 <CAM CAMlevel="1" version="1.1">
 <Header/>
 <AssemblyStructure/>
 <BusinessUseContext/>
 <Extension/> <!-- Optional, repeatable -->
 </CAM>

The purpose of the Header section is to declare properties and parameters for the CAM process to reference. The purpose of the AssemblyStructure section is to capture the required content structure or structures that are needed for the particular business information exchange.

Once the assembly structure(s) have been defined, then the next step is to define the context rules that apply to that content. The technique used is to identify a part of the structure by pointing to it using an XPath target locator reference, and then also applying an assertion using one of the structure predicates provided for that purpose.

There are two sections to these business context rules, default rules normally apply, and conditional rules that only apply if a particular rule block evaluates to true. Rules are expressed using XPath 2.0 syntax along with an additional set of structure predicates that CAM provides that simplify the control over the structure and its information content model.

CAM function predicates include: excludeAttribute(), useAttribute() excludeElement(), useChoice() excludeTree(), useElement() makeOptional(), useTree() makeMandatory(), useAttributeByID() makeRepeatable(), useChoiceByID() setChoice(), useElementByID() setId(), useTreeByID() setLength(), startBlock() setLimit(), endBlock() setValue(), checkCondition() setDateMask(), makeRecursive() setStringMask(), setUID() setNumberMask(), restrictValues() datatype() or setDataType(), restrictValuesByUID() setRequired(), orderChildren() allowNulls(), setDefault() setNumberRange()

The Extension section then allows for the definition of miscellaneous items such as code list values.

For more details on the CAM template approach see the formal OASIS standard specification OASIS CAM v1.1 standard

=== Canonical XML dictionaries ===
The CAM specification is being extended to include canonical XML dictionaries to support Content Assembly using blueprint templates and xslt expander tools. Examples of these include NIEM domain dictionaries and OASIS EDXL and EML dictionaries. For overview of these capabilities see OASIS CAM Blueprints and Dictionaries Quick Guide

=== Schema models ===
The CAM template format also supports the generation of structure component models such as UML/XMI and mind maps. This is achieved via a xslt transformation that renders the CAM template structure, rules and documentation components into the XMI or MM model formats.
