= Cornell NanoScale Science and Technology Facility =

The Cornell NanoScale Science and Technology Facility (CNF) is a scientific user facility and cleanroom which is located at Cornell University in Ithaca, New York. The CNF is one of the sixteen members of the National Nanotechnology Coordinated Infrastructure (NNCI).

The CNF was started as part of a National Science Foundation initiative in 1977, and has subsequently been partially supported by several other NSF programs. It currently receives about $20 million each year in federal funding. In 2004 the CNF moved into its current facility, Duffield Hall, supported by $100 million in support from Cornell. It now includes 15,000 square feet of Level 1000 cleanroom as well as several times more non-cleanroom laboratory space. In 2009 the NNIN received $10 million as part of the American Recovery and Reinvestment Act.

The CNF is a general user facility, and while many users are from Cornell or other nearby universities, it also draws users from a wide range of universities and companies around the world. Roughly 700 scientists use the facility every year, half of whom are associated with Cornell.

The CNF is used for research in a wide range of fields such as MEMS, microfluidics, nanomagnetics and bioelectronics. It includes fabrication tools for processes including electron-beam lithography, photolithography, chemical vapor deposition, electron-beam deposition and reactive ion etching. It also contains characterization equipment including scanning electron microscopes, ellipsometers and probe stations for electrical measurement.
