= Selective digestive decontamination =

Selective digestive decontamination (SDD) is a process used on intensive care units to reduce the occurrence of infections in critically ill people. It involves the administration of antibiotics to reduce bacteria and fungi in the digestive tract to prevent them from causing illness in those at high risk. It can target both normal and abnormal flora.

A related treatment (selective oropharyngeal decontamination, SOD) consists of the same antibiotics but only to remove bacteria in the mouth and not the bowel.
