= Software Design and Development =

NSW HSC elective course

Software Design and Development (SDD) is the study of designing and developing software. SDD is also a subject offered to senior high school students in Australia in university entrance exams such as the Higher School Certificate (HSC) and the Victorian Certificate of Education (VCE).

== Victoria ==
=== VCE Course ===
In Victoria, the course in the VCE is known as Information Technology: Software Development.

== New South Wales ==
=== HSC Course ===
In New South Wales, the course was changed to Software Engineering in 2024 following a syllabus update. SE is separated into the Preliminary (Year 11) and HSC (Year 12) courses. A prerequisite for the HSC Course is successful completion of the Preliminary Course, which is the same for any other course in the HSC. The course also often requires a major project, in which students must plan, design and develop a software application. The course in NSW is set out in the NSW Board of Studies (now known as the New South Wales Education Standards Authority) HSC Software Design and Development syllabus document.

==== Preliminary Course ====
Concepts and Issues in the Design and Development of Software (30%)

- Social and ethical issues
- Hardware and software
- Software development approaches

Introduction to Software Development (50%)

- Defining the problem and planning software solutions
- Building software solutions
- Checking software solutions
- Modifying software solutions

Developing Software Solutions (20%)

=== Course Structure ===
Development and Impact of Software Solutions (15%)

- Social and ethical issues
- Application of software development approaches

Software Development Cycle (40%)

- Defining and understanding the problem
- Planning and design of software solutions
- Implementation of software solutions
- Testing and evaluation of software solutions
- Maintenance of software solutions

Developing a Solution Package (25%)

Options (20%) One of the following options:

1. Programming paradigms, or
2. The interrelationship between hardware and software

== See also ==
Information Processes and Technology, which is a similar course offered in the HSC.
