= OASIS TOSCA =

OASIS standard language for web services

Topology and Orchestration Specification for Cloud Applications (TOSCA) is an OASIS standard language originally written to describe a topology of cloud based web services, their components, relationships, and the processes that manage them. The TOSCA standard includes specifications of a file archive format called CSAR. Version 2.0 extended the field of application to cover a wider range of scenarios comprising nodes and the relationships between them.

== History ==
On 16 January 2014, OASIS TOSCA Technical Committee approved TOSCA 1.0 as a standard. Version 1.3 was approved on 26 February 2020 and version 2.0 was published as a full OASIS standard on 9 September 2025.

== Specification ==
The specification is fully described in the standard and has been cited in academic papers such as

The standard is maintained by the OASIS Technical Committee in a github repository and there is a companion repository for community contributions.

=== Related specifications ===
Commercialization of cloud computing offerings has required manageability of tenant applications, particularly on a large scale. As such, vendors who offer their services to a wide market have written related standards that predate, or have been developed concurrently, with the OASIS TOSCA standard.

==== Amazon AWS CloudFormation template ====
The AWS CloudFormation template is a JSON data standard to allow cloud application administrators to define a collection of related AWS resources.

CloudFormation is a proprietary format from AWS, that is not TOSCA based, and therefore does not bring the promise OASIS TOSCA is targeting. Check this grammar compared to the OASIS TOSCA one .

==== OpenStack Heat ====
The OpenStack Foundation has also defined a similar standard for specifying resources and the orchestrations for managing infrastructure, and application lifecycles. The heat-translator project was one of the first to adopt TOSCA for standardized templating.

== Related projects ==
=== Cloudify ===
Cloudify allows organizations an effortless transition to public cloud and Cloud-Native architecture by enabling them to automate their existing infrastructure alongside cloud native and distributed edge resources. Cloudify also allows users to manage different orchestration and automation domains as part of one common CI/CD pipeline.

Cloudify is an open source, multi-cloud orchestration platform featuring unique technology that packages infrastructure, networking, and existing automation tools into certified blueprints. It is an open-source cloud orchestration framework. which enables you to model applications and services and automate their entire life cycle.

=== Alien4Cloud ===
Application LIfecycle ENabler for Cloud (Alien4Cloud) is an open-source TOSCA based designer and cloud application lifecycle management platform. It is integrated with Yorc for runtime orchestration though other orchestrators can be plugged to it.

=== Opera (xOpera orchestrator) ===
The xOpera project provides a set of tools for orchestration and automation of the cloud applications. The xOpera includes Opera orchestrator (Python library), a lightweight, open-source and state-aware orchestrator based on Ansible and TOSCA Simple Profile in YAML v1.3. The project also includes a tool, called Template Library Publishing Service, for publishing TOSCA components and templates. In 2021 xOpera project was presented on the TOSCA TC implementation stories webinar.

=== Yorc ===
Ystia Orchestrator (Yorc) is an open-source TOSCA orchestration engine. It aims to support the whole application lifecycle, from deployment, scaling, monitoring, self-healing, self-scaling to application upgrade, over hybrid infrastructures (IaaS, HPC schedulers, CaaS).

=== Ubicity ===
Ubicity provides tooling and orchestrators based on TOSCA.

=== MiCADOscale ===
MiCADOscale is an open-source TOSCA-based cloud resource orchestration framework for applications using Docker.

=== Infrastructure Manager ===
Infrastructure Manager (IM) is an open-source TOSCA-based orchestration framework based on YAML.

== Related research projects ==
=== CloudCycle ===
CloudCycle was funded by the German Federal Ministry for Economic Affairs and Energy and ran from November 2011 to October 2014. It covered an open source TOSCA modeler and an open source TOSCA interpreter

=== SeaClouds ===
SeaClouds is an EU FP7 funded project whose mission is to provide adaptive multi-cloud management of service-based applications. It natively supports TOSCA, and it is participating in the standardization of such standard.

=== DICE ===
DICE is an EU H2020 funded project offering a model-driven DevOps toolchain to develop big data applications. TOSCA acts as the pivot language between modelling notations and the deployment, monitoring, etc., by offering standard infrastructure-as-code that can be generated automatically from models.

=== COLA ===
Cloud Orchestration at the Level of Application (COLA) is an EU H2020 funded project to develop a generic pluggable framework that supports the optimal and secure deployment and run-time orchestration of cloud applications. The developed framework (MiCADOscale) is a cloud-agnostic solution that allows existing applications to be scaled dynamically in real-time based on the current demand. The definition of the application is done in a TOSCA-based application description.

=== RADON ===
RADON is an EU H2020 project focusing on providing the DevOps framework for creating and managing microservices-based applications. The project uses TOSCA with Ansible for defining IaC blueprints that can be graphically edited with Eclipse Winery. The application lifecycle management was managed with the xOpera SaaS.

== See also ==
- Web Services Conversation Language
- WS-CDL
- Workflow
- XML Process Definition Language
- Yet Another Workflow Language
