= Caucasus Nature Fund =

- Founded: 2007
- Founders: Conservation International, Federal Ministry for Economic Cooperation and Development(BMZ), World Wide Fund for Nature (WWF)
- Type: Conservation Trust Fund
- Purpose: Protected Areas
- Location(s): Frankfurt am Main, Germany and Tbilisi, Georgia
- Region served: Armenia, Azerbaijan, Georgia
- Endowment: €30.42 million (2025)

The Caucasus Nature Fund (CNF) is a German non-profit organization established in 2007 to provide financial support for protected areas in the South Caucasus countries of Armenia, Azerbaijan and Georgia. Its activities include financing operating costs, supporting protected area management and contributing to the long-term financial sustainability of protected areas. The fund works in partnership with the governments of the three countries, providing financial assistance alongside government allocations.

Headquartered in Frankfurt am Main, Germany, with program offices in Tbilisi, Georgia and Yerevan, Armenia, the trust supports 18 protected areas across the three countries.

== Caucasus Biodiversity Hotspot ==
The Caucasus is recognised as a biodiversity hotspot by Conservation International and the World Wide Fund for Nature (WWF), owing to its diversity of species and high levels of endemism." according to both Conservation International and WWF.

Formed by the isthmus between the Black and Caspian Seas, the Caucasus ecoregion contains plant and animal species from Europe, Central Asia, the Middle East and North Africa, as well as endemic species. The hotspot covers about 500,000 square kilometers, roughly the size of France, including Armenia, Azerbaijan and Georgia, as well as small parts of Russia, Iran and Turkey. The area has nine climate zones, ranging from semi-desert to high-altitude tundra and from alpine meadow to deep forest. It is home to more than 6,400 plant species and to 348 bird, 131 mammal, 86 reptile, 17 amphibian and 127 freshwater fish species.

== Funding activities ==
In 2022, CNF awarded four subdivisions of Armenia's Ministry of the Environment €335,000 to cover expenses. €142,500 was allocated to the Zangezur Biosphere Complex, €80,000 to Khosrov Forest State Reserve, €82,500 to Dilijan National Park, and €30,000 to Lake Arpi National Park.

In 2023, CNF allocated approximately €1.083 million to protected areas in Armenia. The funding included €133,000 for Khosrov Forest State Reserve, €336,000 for the Zangezur Biosphere Complex, €184,000 for Dilijan National Park, €55,000 for Lake Arpi National Park and €95,000 for the Arpa Protected Landscape.

On 7 March 2024, CNF signed six grant agreements with the Agency of Protected Areas of Georgia, with a combined value of more than €2 million. The agreements provided financial and technical support to six protected-area administrations, including funding for staff and ranger salaries.

According to CNF's 2024 annual report, the organization provided direct operating-cost funding to 21 protected areas in Armenia and Georgia, covering more than 850,000 hectares. The portfolio included five protected areas in Armenia and 16 in Georgia. Direct funding for their operating costs exceeded €1.6 million, supplemented by more than €1 million in technical assistance and related support.

In May 2026, CNF signed two grant agreements with the Ministry of Environmental Protection and Agriculture of Georgia to finance the operating expenses of the administrations of the Aragvi Protected Landscape and the Truso Protected Landscape.

In April 2026, four Armenian protected-area organizations received a total of €285,000 in funding from CNF for the 2026 financial year. The allocations comprised €90,000 for the Zangezur Biosphere Complex, €75,000 for Khosrov Forest State Reserve, €70,000 for Dilijan National Park and €50,000 for Lake Arpi National Park.

== Notable Board Members ==
A notable advisory board member is Gabriela Von Habsburg, the granddaughter of Charles I, last emperor of Austria.
