= Election Markup Language =

XML standard for election management purposes

Election Markup Language (EML) is an XML-based standard to support end to end management of election processes.

== History ==
The OASIS Election and Voter Services Technical Committee, which met for the first time in May 2001, was chartered "To develop a standard for the structured interchange of data among hardware, software, and service providers who engage in any aspect of providing election or voter services to public or private organizations. The services performed for such elections include but are not limited to voter role[sic]/membership maintenance (new voter registration, membership and dues collection, change of address tracking, etc.), citizen/membership credentialing, redistricting, requests for absentee/expatriate ballots, election calendaring, logistics management (polling place management), election notification, ballot delivery and tabulation, election results reporting and demographics."

To help establish context for the specifics contained in the XML schemas that make up EML, the Committee also developed a generic end-to-end election process model, initially based on work by election.com, whose CTO chaired the first meetings.

== Overview ==
Voting is one of the foundations of democratic processes. In addition to providing for the orderly transfer of power, it also cements the citizen's trust and confidence in an organization or government when it operates efficiently. Access to standardized information in the voting process for voters as well as standardized data interchange can better facilitate verification and oversight for election procedures. Standards for clear, robust and precisely understood processes help promote confidence in the results. Election data interchange standardization fosters an open marketplace that stimulates cost effective delivery and adoption of new technology without obsolescing existing investments. However, traditional verification methods and oversight will continue to be vital, and in fact these things become more critical with the use of technology. A healthy democracy requires participation from citizens and continuous independent monitoring of processes, procedures and outcomes. The OASIS EML standard seeks to help facilitate transparency, access and involvement for citizens to the election process.

The primary function of an electronic voting system is to capture voter preferences reliably and securely and then report results accurately, while meeting legal requirements for privacy. The process of vote capture occurs between 'a voter' (individual person) and 'an e-voting system' (machine). It is critical that any election system be able to prove that a voter's choice is captured correctly and anonymously, and that the vote is not subject to tampering, manipulation or other sources of undue influence.

These universal democratic principles can be summarized as a list of fundamental requirements, or 'six commandments', for electronic voting systems:

1. Keep each voter's choice an inviolable secret.
2. Allow each eligible voter to vote only once, and only for those offices for which he/she is authorized to cast a vote.
3. Do not permit tampering with the voting systems operations, nor allow voters to sell their votes.
4. Report all votes accurately
5. The voting system shall remain operable throughout each election.
6. Keep an audit trail to detect any breach of [2] and [4] but without violating [1].

EML was developed following these guidelines.

=== Design ===
The goal of the committee is to develop an Election Markup Language (EML) for end-to-end use within the election process. This is a set of data and message definitions described as a set of XML schemas and covering a wide range of transactions that occurs during various phases and stages of the life cycle of an election. To achieve this, the committee decided that it required a common terminology and definition of election processes that could be understood internationally. The committee therefore started by defining the generic election process models described here.

These processes are illustrative, covering the vast majority of election types and forming a basis for defining the Election Markup Language itself. EML has been designed such that elections that do not follow this process model should still be able to use EML as a basis for the exchange of election-related messages.

EML is focused on defining open, secure, standardised and interoperable interfaces between components of election systems and thereby providing transparent and secure interfaces between various parts of an election system. The scope of election security, integrity and audit included in these interface descriptions and the related discussions are intended to cover security issues pertinent only to the standardised interfaces and not to the internal or external security requirements of the various components of election systems.

The security requirement for the election system design, implementation or evaluation must be placed within the context of the vulnerabilities and threats analysis of a particular election scenario. As such the references to security within EML are not to be taken as comprehensive requirements for all election systems in all election scenarios, nor as recommendations of sufficiency of approach when addressing all the security aspects of election system design, implementation or evaluation. In fact, the data security mechanisms described in EML documentation are all optional, enabling compliance with EML without regard for system security at all. It is anticipated that implementers may develop a complementary document for a specific election scenario, which refines the security issues defined in this document and determines their specific strategy and approach by leveraging what EML provides.

EML is meant to assist and enable the election process and does not require any changes to traditional methods of conducting elections. The extensibility of EML makes it possible to adjust to various e-democracy processes without affecting the process. Conceptually EML simply enables the exchange of data between the various end-to-end election stages and processes in a standardized way.

The solution outlined in EML is non-proprietary and will work as a template for any election scenario using electronic systems for all or part of the process. The objective is to introduce a uniform and reliable way to allow election systems to interact with each other. The OASIS EML standard is intended to reinforce public confidence in the election process and to facilitate the job of democracy builders by introducing guidelines for the selection or evaluation of future election systems.

For more details on the EML approach see the formal OASIS standard specification.

== Versions ==
Version	Status	Date
7.0	Committee Specification 01 (CS01)	27 October 2011
6.0	Committee Specification 01 (CS01)	19 August 2010
5.0	OASIS Standard (OS)	1 December 2007
4.0	OASIS Standard (OS)	1 February 2006
3.0	Committee Specification	24 February 2003
2.0	Committee Specification	5 September 2002
1.0	Committee Specification	13 May 2002

== Adoption ==
The Dutch Electoral Council specifies EML_NL, a EML dialect based on EML 5.0.

The Australian Electoral Commission used to provide EML files in their Media Feed for the release of up-to-date counts for federal elections.

== Endorsements ==
Ron Rivest, computer scientist and member of the Technical Guidelines Development Committee of the US Election Assistance Commission was quoted as saying "EML is an example of the kind of consensus-based, publicly available common format that enables the exchange of electronic records between different components in election systems."

== See also ==
- OASIS
- VoiceXML
- XML
- XML Signature
