= Java Web Services Development Pack =

Software development kit

The Java Web Services Development Pack (JWSDP) is a free software development kit (SDK) for developing Web Services, Web applications and Java applications with the newest technologies for Java.

Oracle replaced JWSDP with GlassFish. All components of JWSDP are part of GlassFish and WSIT and several are in Java SE 6 ("Mustang"). The source is available under the Open Source Initiative-approved CDDL license.

== Java APIs ==
These are the components and APIs available in the JWSDP 1.6:

- Java API for XML Processing (JAXP), v 1.3
- Java API for XML Registries (JAXR)
- Java Architecture for XML Binding (JAXB), v 1.0 and 2.0
- JAX-RPC v 1.1
- JAX-WS v 2.0
- SAAJ (SOAP with Attachments API for Java)
- Web Services Registry

Starting with JWSDP 1.6, the JAX-RPC and JAX-WS implementations support the Fast Infoset standard for the binary encoding of the XML infoset. Earlier versions of JWSDP also included

- Java Servlet
- JavaServer Pages
- JavaServer Faces

== Related technologies ==
There are many other Java implementations of Web Services or XML processors. Some of them support the Java standards, some support other standards or non-standard features. Related technologies include:

- Eclipse Metro - web services stack from GlassFish
- Apache Axis - web services framework
- XINS - RPC/web services framework
- xmlenc - XML output library
- JBossWS - web services stack from JBoss
