= WS-I Basic Profile =

Interoperability guidance for core web services specifications

The WS-I Basic Profile (official abbreviation is BP), a specification from the Web Services Interoperability industry consortium (WS-I), provides interoperability guidance for core Web Services specifications such as SOAP, WSDL, and UDDI. The profile uses Web Services Description Language (WSDL) to enable the description of services as sets of endpoints operating on messages.

To understand the importance of WSI-BP, note that it defines a much narrower set of valid services than the full WSDL or SOAP schema. Many common platforms (listed below) support WSI-BP but do not support services outside of it. Compare the WSDL 1.1 specification to the subset permitted in WSI-BP. Also note that WSI-BP generally narrows the SOAP specification. There is a notable exception where WSI expands on the SOAP standard, and that is in adding xml:lang attribute on fault elements.

== Versions ==
- Version 1.0 of this profile was released in early 2004.
- Version 1.1 published in 2006 does not have the same scope as version 1.0. The part of version 1.0 dealing with serialization of envelopes and their representation in messages has been moved to a new profile called Simple Soap Binding Profile (SSBP)
- Version 1.2 was finalized in November 2010. The main new features are the support for MTOM binary attachments and WS-Addressing
- Version 2.0 was also published in November 2010. It uses SOAP 1.2, UDDI 3 and WS-Addressing

== Compliant framework ==
The following is a list of frameworks claiming to be compliant with this profile:

- SAP - Sybase Unwired Platform
- Oracle Weblogic Server 10.3 is Basic Profile compliant as well as WS-I Basic Security Profile compliant
- ASP.NET 2.0 - Web Services are Basic Profile compliant
- Microsoft BizTalk Server
- Eclipse Metro, the bundle including the JAX-WS Reference Implementation (JAX-WS RI) and the Tango (WSIT) project.
- IBM WebSphere Application Server Version 5.0.2 to 5.1 are BP 1.0 compliant version 6.0+ are BP 1.1 compliant
- Apache Axis 1.2+ is BP 1.0 compliant
- Apache Axis2
- Celtix
- gSOAP is BP 1.0a, 1.1, and 1.2 compliant
- Software AG webMethods version 7 and 8
- JBossWS
- Codehaus XFire
- Apache CXF, the merger of Codehaus XFire and Celtix
- Gosu, the Gosu language inherently supports WS-I webservices as native types.
- Cordys
- SpringWS
