= Java XML =

Application programming interfaces

Java XML is a set of separate application programming interfaces (APIs) originally developed by Sun Microsystems to allow Java programs to work with XML-structured data.

== API definitions ==
- Java API for XML Processing (JAXP)
- Java API for XML Messaging (JAXM)
- Jakarta XML RPC (JAX-RPC) — formerly Java API for XML Based RPC deprecated for Java API for XML Web Services
- Jakarta XML Registries (JAXR) — formerly Java API for XML Registries
- Jakarta XML Web Services (JAX-WS) — formerly Java API for XML Web Services
- Jakarta RESTful Web Services (JAX-RS) — formerly Java API for RESTful Web Services
- Java API for XQuery (XQJ)
- Jakarta XML Binding (JAXB) — formerly Java Architecture for XML Binding (this was its official Sun name, even though it is an API, see )
- StAX (Streaming XML processing) — compatible with JDK 1.4 and above, included in JDK 1.6

Only the Java API for XML Processing (JAXP) is a required API in Enterprise Java Beans Specification 1.3.

== Implementations ==
A number of different open-source software packages implement these APIs:

- Apache Xerces — One of the original and most popular SAX and DOM parsers
- Apache Xalan — XSLT/XPath implementation, included in JDK 1.4 and above as the default transformer (XSLT 1.0)
- Saxon XSLT — alternative highly specification-compliant XSLT/XPath/XQuery processor (supports both XSLT 1.0 and 2.0)
- Woodstox — An open-source StAX and SAX (as of version 3.2) implementation
