= Crimson Tide =

Crimson Tide may refer to:

== Arts and entertainment ==
- The Crimson Tide, a 1919 book by Robert W. Chambers
- Crimson Tide (film), 1995 film
  - Crimson Tide (soundtrack), soundtrack that accompanies the 1995 film
  - Crimson Tide, a 1995 book by Richard P. Henrick
- The Crimson Tide, a Fighting Fantasy gamebook, 1992
- "Crimson Tide", a song by Destroyer from the 2020 album Have We Met

== Sports ==
- Alabama Crimson Tide, the intercollegiate athletic varsity teams of the University of Alabama
- Vancouver Island Crimson Tide, a Canadian rugby union team
- Crimson Tide, the Pottsville, Pennsylvania football team
- Crimson Tide, the former name of Spartanburg High School football team

== See also ==
- Crimson (disambiguation)
- Red tide, a phenomenon of discoloration of sea surface
