= Nokogiri =

Nokogiri may refer to:

- Japanese saw, a woodworking saw
- Nokogiri (software), a library to parse HTML and XML

== See also ==
- Mount Nokogiri (disambiguation)
