= Dom4j =

dom4j
- Stable release: 2.1.4 / January 22, 2023
- Repository: github.com/dom4j/dom4j
- Written in: Java
- Platform: Cross-platform
- License: BSD licenses
- Website: dom4j.github.io

dom4j is an open-source Java library for working with XML, XPath and XSLT. It is compatible with DOM, SAX and JAXP standards.

The library is distributed under an BSD-style license.

== Versions ==
- The stable version of dom4j for Java 1.4, 1.6.1, was released on May 16, 2005.
- The stable version of dom4j for Java 1.5, 2.0.3, was released on April 11, 2020.
- The stable version of dom4j, 2.1.3, was released on April 12, 2020.
- The latest stable version of dom4j, 2.1.4, was released on January 22, 2023.
