= Apache XML =

Category of projects at Apache

Apache XML is a category of projects at the Apache Software Foundation that focus on XML-related projects.

== Active projects ==
- Xerces: An XML parser for Java, C++ and Perl
- Xalan: An XSLT stylesheet processor for Java and C++ which implements the XPath query language.
- Forrest: A standards-based documentation framework
- XML-Security: A project providing security functionality for XML data
- XML Commons: A project focusing on common code and guidelines for XML projects
- XMLBeans: An XML-Java binding tool

== Projects related to webservices ==
- SOAP: Is an old implementation of the SOAP. This project based on IBM's SOAP4J implementation. It should no longer be used for new projects. Instead you should favour the Axis implementation.
- XML-RPC: Apache XML-RPC is a Java implementation of XML-RPC, a protocol that uses XML over HTTP to implement remote procedure calls.
- Axis: Apache Axis is the current implementation of the SOAP for Java and C++. It is the successor for the SOAP project.
- WSIF: Web Services Invocation Framework is a simple Java API for invoking Web services.

== Deprecated projects ==
- AxKit: An XML-based web publishing framework in mod_perl
- Crimson: A Java XML parser derived from the Sun Project X Parser
- Xang: Framework for rapid development of dynamic server pages in ECMAScript (JavaScript)
- Xindice: A native XML database
