= XInclude =

XInclude is a generic mechanism for merging XML documents, by writing inclusion tags in the "main" document to automatically include other documents or parts thereof. The resulting document becomes a single composite XML Information Set. The XInclude mechanism can be used to incorporate content from either XML files or non-XML text files.

XInclude is not natively supported in Web browsers, but may be partially achieved by using some extra JavaScript code.

== Example ==
For example, including the text file license.txt:

This document is published under GNU Free Documentation License

in an XHTML document:

<?xml version="1.0"?>
<html xmlns="http://www.w3.org/1999/xhtml"
      xmlns:xi="http://www.w3.org/2001/XInclude">
   <head>...</head>
   <body>
      ...
      <p><xi:include href="license.txt" parse="text"/></p>
   </body>
</html>

gives:

<?xml version="1.0"?>
<html xmlns="http://www.w3.org/1999/xhtml"
      xmlns:xi="http://www.w3.org/2001/XInclude">
   <head>...</head>
   <body>
      ...
      <p>This document is published under GNU Free Documentation License</p>
   </body>
</html>

The mechanism is similar to HTML's <object> tag (which is specific to the HTML markup language), but the XInclude mechanism works with any XML format, such as SVG and XHTML.

== See also ==
- XPath
