= BiM =

Standard defining a binary format for encoding XML

BiM (Binary MPEG format for XML) is an international standard defining a generic binary format for encoding XML documents.

The technical specifications for BiM are found in: MPEG systems technologies - Part 1: Binary MPEG format for XML (ISO/IEC 23001-1) It is also known as MPEG-B Part 1.

== Overview ==
BiM addresses a broad spectrum of applications and requirements by providing generic methods for transmitting and compressing XML documents. The binary MPEG format for XML relies on schema knowledge between encoder and decoder in order to reach high compression efficiency, while providing fragmentation mechanisms for ensuring transmission and processing flexibility. BiM also defines means to compile and transmit schema knowledge information to enable the decoding of compressed XML documents without a priori schema knowledge at the receiving terminal.

BiM is used as the standard binary format for XML encoding in the following technical specifications:

- MPEG-4 Part 20 (ISO/IEC 14496-20) - Lightweight Application Scene Representation (LASeR) and Simple Aggregation Format (SAF).
- MPEG-7 Systems (ISO/IEC 15938-1)
- MPEG-21 Binary Format (ISO/IEC 21000-16)
- TV-Anytime - Broadcast and On-line Services: Search, select, and rightful use of content on personal storage systems (ETSI TS 102 822)
- ARIB - Coding, Transmission and Storage Specification for Broadcasting System Based on Home Servers (ARIB-STD B38)
- ISDB#ISDB-Tmm - ISDB-Tmm (ARIB-B33)
- DVB - Carriage and signalling of TV-Anytime information in DVB transport streams (ETSI TS 102 323)
- DVB - Carriage of Broadband Content Guide information over Internet Protocol (ETSI TS 102 539)
- DVB - Datacast over DVB-H: Electronic Service Guide (ETSI TS 102 471)

== See also ==
- Binary XML
- EXI
- Extensible MPEG-4 Textual Format
