= XML Information Set =

XML Information Set (XML Infoset) is a W3C specification that defines an abstract data model of an XML document in terms of a set of information items. The XML Infoset provides a standardized way to refer to the components of XML documents, serving as a foundation for XML-related standards and tools.

The XML Infoset identifies eleven different types of information items, including the document, elements, attributes, Processing instructions, characters, and namespaces. Each information item has a set of named properties, which represent specific aspects of the XML document being modeled. For example, an element information item has properties such as the element's namespace name, local name, children, and attributes.

An XML document has an information set if it is well-formed and satisfies the namespace constraints. There is no requirement for an XML document to be valid according to a DTD or XML Schema in order to have an information set.

XML was initially developed without a formal definition of its infoset. This conceptual foundation was only formalized by later work beginning in 1999, first published as a separate W3C Working Draft at the end of December that year. The Infoset Recommendation Second Edition was adopted on February 4, 2004.

The XML Information Set specification has become a cornerstone of the XML technology stack, enabling higher-level specifications such as XPath, XSLT, DOM, XQuery, and many others to describe their functionality in terms of the XML Infoset rather than the concrete XML syntax. This abstraction allows these technologies to operate on XML content regardless of its specific serialization format. If a 2.0 version of the XML standard is ever published, it is likely that this would absorb the Infoset recommendation as an integral part of that standard.

== Information items ==
An information set can contain up to eleven different types of information items:

1. The Document Information Item (always present)
2. Element Information Items
3. Attribute Information Items
4. Processing Instruction Information Items
5. Unexpanded Entity Reference Information Items
6. Character Information Items
7. Comment Information Items
8. The Document Type Declaration Information Item
9. Unparsed Entity Information Items
10. Notation Information Items
11. Namespace Information Items

== Infoset augmentation ==
Infoset augmentation or infoset modification refers to the process of modifying the infoset during schema validation, for example by adding default attributes. The augmented infoset is called the post-schema-validation infoset, or PSVI.

Infoset augmentation is somewhat controversial, with claims that it is a violation of modularity and tends to cause interoperability problems, since applications get different information depending on whether or not validation has been performed.

Infoset augmentation is supported by XML Schema but not RELAX NG.

== Serialization ==
Typically, XML Information Set is serialized as XML. There are also serialization formats for Binary XML, CSV, and JSON.

== See also ==
XML Information Set instances:

- Document Object Model
- Xpath data model
- SXML
