= Crimson (disambiguation) =

Crimson is a rich, deep red color.

Crimson may also refer to:

== Arts, entertainment and media ==
=== Fictional character ===
- Crimson (comics), several uses
- Crimson, a character from The Ridonculous Race
- The Crimson, from the 2011 video game Terraria
- Crimson 1, an antagonist from the game Project: Wingman
- Crimson Typhoon, a Jaegar from the 2013 Sci-Fi mecha monster film Pacific Rim

=== Film and television ===
- Crimson (2020 film), directed by Gregory Plotkin
- "Crimson", an episode of Smallville (season 6)

=== Literature ===
- Crimson (Sata novel), 1936/1938 novel by Ineko Sata
- Homo Sapienne, published in English as Crimson, a 2014 work by Niviaq Korneliussen
- Crimson, a 1992 novel by Shirley Conran
- Crimson (comic book), a 1998 comic book series
- The Crimson, the student-run university newspaper of Florida Institute of Technology
- The Harvard Crimson, the student newspaper of Harvard University

=== Music ===
- Crimson (band), an American Christian metal band
- Crimson (Alkaline Trio album), 2005
- Crimson (Code Red album), 2000
- Crimson (Edge of Sanity album), 1996
- Crimson (Nanase Aikawa album), 1998
- Crimson (Sentenced album), 2000
- Crimson (Akina Nakamori album), 1986
- Crimson 3.x, by VAST, 2003
- "Crimson", a song by Erra from Augment, 2013
- "The Crimson", a song by Atreyu from The Curse, 2004
- Crimson Records, an American record label
- Crimson, 2020 album by Volturian
- Crimson/Red, the tenth studio album by English pop band Prefab Sprout

== Computing and software ==
- Crimson, a Java XML parser, part of Apache XML Project
- Crimson Editor, a freeware text editor
- SGI Crimson, a Silicon Graphics computer

== Other uses ==
- Crimson (wrestler) (Anthony Gregory Mayweather, born 1985), American professional wrestler
- Harvard Crimson, the intercollegiate athletic teams of Harvard College
- Crimson, the code name for Canada in the U.S.'s interwar War Plan Red

== See also ==
- Krimson, a Flemish comic book character
