= Apache Xerces =

Collection of software libraries for XML

- Developer: Apache Software Foundation
- Stable release: 2.12.2 (Xerces J); 3.2.3 (Xerces C++) / 24 January 2022 (Xerces J); 10 April 2020 (Xerces C++)
- Operating system: Cross-platform
- Type: XML parser library
- License: Apache License 2.0
- Website: xerces.apache.org

In computing, Xerces is Apache's collection of software libraries for parsing, validating, serializing and manipulating XML. The library implements a number of standard APIs for XML parsing, including DOM, SAX and SAX2. The implementation is available in the Java, C++ and Perl programming languages.

The name "Xerces" is believed to commemorate the extinct Xerces blue butterfly (Glaucopsyche xerces).

== Xerces language versions ==
There are several language versions of the Xerces parser:

- Xerces2 Java, the Java reference implementation
- Xerces C++, a C++ implementation
- Xerces Perl, a Perl implementation. This implementation is a wrapper around the C++ API.

| Language | Release Date | Version |
|---|---|---|
| Java | 2022-01-24 | 2.12.2 |
| C++ | 2024-10-14 | 3.3.0 |
| Perl | 2014-04-30 | 2.7.0 |

== Features ==
The features supported by Xerces depend on the language, the Java version having the most features.

| Feature | Java | C++ | Perl |
|---|---|---|---|
| eXtensible Markup Language (XML) 1.0 Fourth Edition Recommendation | Yes | Partial | Partial |
| eXtensible Markup Language (XML) 1.1 Second Edition Recommendation | Yes | Partial | Partial |
| Namespaces in XML 1.1 Second Edition Recommendation | Yes | Partial | Partial |
| Namespaces in XML 1.0 Second Edition Recommendation | Yes | Partial | Partial |
| XML Inclusions (XInclude) Version 1.0 Second Edition Recommendation | Yes | Yes | Yes |
| Simple API for XML (SAX) | Yes | Yes | Yes |
| Streaming API For XML (StAX) | Yes | No | No |
| DOM Level 2 Core Specification | Yes | Yes | Yes |
| DOM Level 2 Traversal and Range Specification | Yes | Yes | Yes |
| Document Object Model (DOM) Level 3 Core, Load and Save | Yes | Yes | Yes |
| Element Traversal Specification | Yes | Yes | Yes |
| XML Schema 1.0 Structures and Datatypes | Yes | Yes | Yes |
| XML Schema 1.1 Structures and Datatypes | Yes | No | No |
| XML Schema Definition Language (XSD): Component Designators (SCD) | Yes | No | No |
| Java APIs for XML Processing (JAXP) 1.4 | Yes | No | No |

== See also ==
- Apache License
- Java XML
- Apache Xalan

== Notes ==
- Implemented third edition.
- Implemented second edition. Section 2.13 Normalization Checking has not been implemented.
- Implemented first edition.
- Implemented first edition.
