= Glue (disambiguation) =

Glue is any fluid adhesive.

Glue or GLUE may also refer to:

== Arts and entertainment ==
=== Film and television ===
- Glue (film), a 2006 Argentine film written and directed by Alexis Dos Santos
- Glue (TV series), a 2014 British television drama by Jack Thorne
- "Glue" (New Girl), an episode of the American television sitcom
- "Glue" (Weeds), an episode of the American dark comedy-drama television series

=== Music ===
- Glue (Eugene + the Lizards album), 2009
- Glue (Boston Manor album), 2020
- "Glue", a song by Gabriella Cilmi from the 2010 album Ten
- "Glue", a song by Moka Only from the 2011 album Barbecued Horse Contest
- "Glue", a song by Bicep from their 2017 album Bicep
- "Glue", a song by Breathe Carolina from the 2017 EP Coma
- Glue, a hip-hop trio fronted by Adeem (rapper)
- "Glue" a 2023 song by Beabadoobee

=== Other arts ===
- Glue (novel), by Scottish writer Irvine Welsh

== Science and technology ==
- Glue logic, circuitry to interface between off-the-shelf integrated circuits
- GLUE (uncertainty assessment), a method to quantify the uncertainty of model predictions
- Glue semantics, a syntax-semantics interface formalism based on linear logic
- Quotient space (topology) or gluing spaces, gluing points or subspaces together

=== Computing ===
- Glue records, records used in the Domain Name System
- General Language Understanding Evaluation, a benchmark in Natural Language Understanding
- Grid Laboratory Uniform Environment, a technology-agnostic information model for a uniform representation of Grid resources
- glue (software), a data-visualization package
- Glue code, code that allows components to interoperate
- Glue language, a programming language used for connecting software components together
- webMethods Glue, an enterprise web services platform

== See also ==
- Glu (disambiguation)
