= Simple Soap Binding Profile =

Web service specification

Simple Soap Binding Profile (official abbreviation is SSBP) is a specification from the Web Services Interoperability industry consortium. It is intended as a support profile for the WS-I Basic Profile. Its primary purpose is to simplify message exchange across different platforms by constraining SOAP to a standard, interoperable, and consistently supported subset.

This profile defines the way WSDL (Web Services Description Language) documents are to bind operations to a specific transport protocol SOAP.
