= Jakarta SOAP with Attachments =

Application programming interface

Jakarta SOAP with Attachments (SAAJ; formerly SOAP with Attachments API for Java), as part of Jakarta XML Web Services (JAX-WS), provides a standard way to send XML documents over the Internet from the Jakarta EE platform.

SAAJ enables developers to produce and consume messages conforming to the SOAP 1.1 and 1.2 specifications and SOAP with Attachments note. It can be used as an alternative to JAX-RPC or JAX-WS.

SOAP or Simple Object Access Protocol was created by Mohsen Al-Ghosein, Dave Winer, Bob Atkinson, and Don Box in 1998 with help from Microsoft.
