= Crimson (comics) =

Crimson, in comics, may refer to:

- Crimson (comic book), a comic book series from Images Comics' Cliffhanger imprint and DC Comics' Wildstorm imprint
- Crimson, one of the aliases used by Wildstorm character Jodi Slayton

It may also refer to:

- Crimson Avenger, a number of DC Comics superheroes
- Crimson Commando, a number of Marvel Comics superheroes
- Crimson Cowl, a number of Marvel Comics superheroes
- Crimson Crusader, a Marvel Comics characters in ClanDestine
- Crimson Curse, a Marvel Comics character from the MC2 universe
- Crimson Dawn, a fictional substance that has appeared in Marvel Comics
- Crimson Dynamo, a number of Marvel Comics character
- Crimson Fox, a DC Comics superheroine
- Crimson Gem of Cyttorak, a fictional object in the Marvel Universe which provides the power for Juggernaut
- Crimson Guard, a group in GI Joe who appear in the comic book adaptation

== See also ==
- Crimson (disambiguation)
