= Glu =

Glu or GLU may refer to:

- Glu Mobile, an American mobile game publisher
- Glutamic acid
- "Glu" (song), a 2023 song by Usher
- God Lives Underwater, an American industrial rock band
  - God Lives Underwater (EP)
- Gula language (Chad)
- Guyana Labour Union
- OpenGL Utility Library, a computer graphics library

== See also ==
- Glue (disambiguation)
