= Jakarta XML Registries =

Application programming interface

Jakarta XML Registries (JAXR; formerly Java API for XML Registries) defines a standard API for Jakarta EE applications to access and programmatically interact with various kinds of metadata registries. JAXR is one of the Java XML programming APIs. The JAXR API was developed under the Java Community Process as JSR 93.

JAXR provides a uniform and standard Java API for accessing different kinds of XML-based metadata registry. Current implementations of JAXR support ebXML Registry version 2.0, and UDDI version 2.0. More such registries could be defined in the future. JAXR provides an API for the clients to interact with XML registries and a service provider interface (SPI) for the registry providers so they can plug in their registry implementations. The JAXR API insulates application code from the underlying registry mechanism. When writing a JAXR based client to browse or populate a registry, the code does not have to change if the registry changes, for instance from UDDI to ebXML.

Jakarta XML Registries (JAXR) was removed from Jakarta EE 9.
