= Crimson Tide (soundtrack) =

Crimson Tide (Music from the Original Motion Picture)

Film score by Hans Zimmer
- Released: May 16, 1995
- Studio: Todd-AO Scoring Stage, Studio City, California; Sony Scoring Stage, Sony Pictures Studios, Culver City, California; AIR Studios, London; Media Ventures, Santa Monica, California
- Genre: Electronic; orchestral
- Length: 60:26
- Label: Hollywood
- Producer: Hans Zimmer; Jay Rifkin

Hans Zimmer chronology
Drop Zone (1994)	Crimson Tide (1995)	Beyond Rangoon (1995)

Crimson Tide (Music from the Original Motion Picture) is the film score composed by Hans Zimmer to the 1995 film Crimson Tide directed by Tony Scott. The score was released on May 16, 1995, and won a Grammy Award in 1996 for Best Instrumental Composition Written for a Motion Picture or for Television.

== Background ==
Hans Zimmer composed the score in his third collaboration with Tony Scott after Days of Thunder (1990) and True Romance (1993). Zimmer noted that his composition for Black Rain (1989) initiated the trend of action film scores having influenced by his composition and style for the film, which led to a different approach for Crimson Tide, being an "evolutionary step". The score employs a blend of orchestra, choir, and synthesizer sounds. Nick Glennie-Smith, besides providing additional music, also conducted the orchestra, while Harry Gregson-Williams conducted the choir. The score utilizes equipment from Euphonix, Yamaha, Spatializer, Steinberg. With the critical praise for Zimmer's score in Crimson Tide, Zimmer considered the film's music for The Peacemaker (1997) as a descendant of Crimson Tide, where he could manage to finish off all his ideas he did not get right in that film. Within the score is the well-known naval hymn, "Eternal Father, Strong to Save".

== Release ==
The score was released under the Hollywood Records label on May 16, 1995, in physical formats. The album features only five songs, each ranging from two to 23 minutes long.

== Reception ==
Craig Lysy of Movie Music UK wrote "This score was the catalyst that unleashed the Zimmer revolution, which forever transformed film score art [...] While Rain Man opened the door to Zimmer’s new methodology, Crimson Tide blew the door off its hinges, ushering in his new sound that would dominate Hollywood blockbuster films for decades. Indeed, as the Alfred Newman of our age, Zimmer mentored and fostered the development of a new generation of composers who utilized and adapted his techniques, which resonated with a new generation of movie goers who liked his bold modern approach. If Crimson Tide was the film score that unleashed the Zimmer revolution, the Alabama Anthem was what defined it. This proud, bold and powerful theme captured the film’s emotional core and fully realized Bruckheimer’s vision. In scene after scene Zimmer’s score was perfectly conceived, impactful and very successful in driving the film’s narrative."

Christian Clemmensen of Filmtracks wrote "Crimson Tide is a remarkably effective and obviously influential score". Jason Ankeny of AllMusic wrote "For better or for worse, Hans Zimmer's Crimson Tide remains one of the defining film scores of the 1990s—the first and most popular of the electronic action scores that dominated the genre throughout the latter half of the decade, its propulsive, bombastic approach perfectly captures the artifice and soullessness of a Hollywood era dominated by computer-generated effects and genetically engineered stars. Zimmer's frantic, testosterone-fueled melodies embrace function at the expense of form—there's nothing remotely noteworthy except their sheer relentlessness and visceral intensity. There's no doubting how perfectly this kind of music complements the modern action blockbuster—whether the previous statement constitutes a ringing endorsement or a scathing indictment depends entirely on the perspective of the reader." Duane Byrge of The Hollywood Reporter and Ian Nathan of Empire noted Zimmer's being "titanic" and "stirring". Zimmer described the score as one of his personal favorites.

== Track listing ==
No.	Title	Length
1.	"Mutiny"	8:57
2.	"Alabama"	23:50
3.	"Little Ducks"	2:03
4.	"1SQ"	18:03
5.	"Roll Tide / Hymn: Eternal Father, Strong to Save"	7:33
Total length:		60:26

== Personnel ==
Credits adapted from liner notes:

- Music composer and synthesizer – Hans Zimmer
- Music producer – Hans Zimmer, Jay Rifkin
- Music compiler – Jeff Rona
- Orchestration – Bruce Fowler, Nick Glennie-Smith, Ladd McIntosh, Suzette Moriarty
- Orchestra conductor – Nick Glennie-Smith
- Orchestra contractor – Sandy DeCrescent
- Choir conductor – Harry Gregson-Williams
- Choir recording – Paul Hulme
- Choir supervisor – Maggie Rodford
- Sampler – Bob Daspit
- Solo trumpet – Malcolm McNab
- Engineer – Bruno Roussel, Gregg Silk, Slamm Andrews
- Recording and mixing – Jay Rifkin, Alan Meyerson
- Mastering – Dan Hersch
- Score editor – Bob Badami, Paul Silver
- Copyist – Dominic Fidelibus
- Executive producer – Don Simpson, Jerry Bruckheimer
- Musical assistance – Emma Burnham, Marc Streitenfeld

== Accolades ==
Award	Category	Recipient	Result
Grammy Awards	Best Instrumental Composition Written for a Motion Picture or for Television	Hans Zimmer	Won
Saturn Awards	Saturn Award for Best Music	Hans Zimmer	Nominated
