= Mount Nokogiri =

Mount Nokogiri can refer to:

- Mount Nokogiri (Chiba) (Nokogiriyama), a mountain in Honshū, Japan.
- Mount Nokogiri (Hokkaidō) (Nokogiridake), a mountain in Hokkaidō, Japan.
- Mount Nokogiri (Akaishi) (Nokogiridake), in the Akaishi Mountains, forming part of the boundary between Nagano and Yamanashi Prefectures
