= XQuery and XPath Data Model =

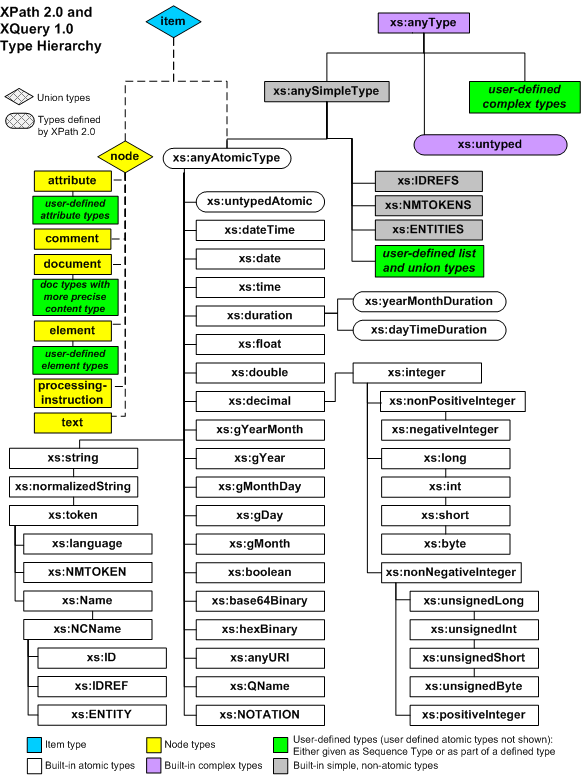
The XDM type hierarchy

The XQuery and XPath Data Model (XDM) is the data model shared by the XPath 2.0, XSLT 2.0, XQuery, and XForms programming languages. It is defined in a W3C recommendation. Originally, it was based on the XPath 1.0 data model which in turn is based on the XML Information Set.

The XDM consists of flat sequences of zero or more items which can be typed or untyped, and are either atomic values or XML nodes (of seven kinds: document, element, attribute, text, namespace, processing instruction, and comment). Instances of the XDM can optionally be XML schema-validated.
