= WebMethods Glue =

webMethods Glue is an enterprise web services platform from webMethods. It provides web services/SOAP capabilities to existing Java and C/C++ applications.

Developers use the Java-based product to add enterprise web services integration to legacy applications with reduced programming effort. It is an embeddable product (small footprint) that turns a non-web service application into one that exposes its functionality as a web services. Similar to the open source Apache Axis, the Glue product provides a layer of web service interoperability with existing applications.

== Product features ==
webMethods Glue features include:

- Little or no coding to expose application functionality as a web service
- Standalone operation if required (does not need an application server)
- Fast local messaging
- Transparent Java/XML integration
- Web services standards support
- Small memory footprint

== Product history ==
Created by The Mind Electric, GLUE—as it was then named—was the company's flagship product. They released it in two forms: a free, unsupported "standard" version, and a company-supported but commercially licensed "professional" edition.

In September 2003 GLUE featured in a Microsoft Press book, Microsoft .NET and J2EE Interoperability Toolkit.

webMethods acquired the product as part of its merger with The Mind Electric. The merger resulted in rebranding the product with the webMethods prefix to become webMethods Glue.

The webMethods Glue product 6.5.x maintenance ended on May 31, 2010, and support ended a year later.

== Release history ==
- GLUE 3.0 - Aug 2002
- GLUE 4.0 - April 2003
- GLUE 4.1 - June 2003

== Technologies and standards ==
HTTP, Servlets, XML, SOAP, WSDL, and UDDI
