= Web Services Interoperability =

Industry consortium to promote web services

The Web Services Interoperability Organization (WS-I) was an industry consortium created in 2002 and chartered to promote interoperability amongst the stack of web services specifications. WS-I did not define standards for web services; rather, it created guidelines and tests for interoperability. In July 2010, WS-I joined OASIS, a standardization consortium, as a member section. It operated until December 2017. The WS-I standards were then maintained by relevant technical committees within OASIS.

It was governed by a board of directors consisting of the founding members (IBM, Microsoft, BEA Systems, SAP, Oracle, Fujitsu, Hewlett-Packard, and Intel) and two elected members (Sun Microsystems and webMethods). After it joined OASIS, other organizations have joined the WS-I technical committee, including CA Technologies, JumpSoft and Booz Allen Hamilton.

The organization's deliverables included profiles, sample applications that demonstrate the profiles' use, and test tools to help determine profile conformance.

== WS-I profiles ==
According to WS-I, a profile is

A set of named web services specifications at specific revision levels, together with a set of implementation and interoperability guidelines recommending how the specifications may be used to develop interoperable web services.

- WS-I Basic Profile
- WS-I Basic Security Profile
- Simple Soap Binding Profile

== WS-I profile compliance ==
The WS-I is not a certifying authority; thus, every vendor can claim to be compliant to a profile. However the use of the test tool is required before a company can claim a product to be compliant. See WS-I Trademarks and Compliance claims requirements

== See also ==
- Web Services Resource Framework
- OASIS
