= Metro WSIT =

Open-source web service

Web Services Interoperability Technology (WSIT) is an open-source project started by Sun Microsystems to develop the next-generation of Web service technologies. It provides interoperability between Java Web Services and Microsoft's Windows Communication Foundation (WCF).

It consists of Java programming language APIs that enable advanced WS-* features to be used in a way that is compatible with Microsoft's Windows Communication Foundation as used by .NET. The interoperability between different products is accomplished by implementing a number of Web Services specifications, like JAX-WS that provides interoperability between Java Web Services and Microsoft Windows Communication Foundation.

WSIT is currently under development as part of Eclipse Metro.

WSIT is a series of extensions to the basic SOAP protocol, and so uses JAX-WS and JAXB. It is not a new protocol such as the binary DCOM.

WSIT implements the WS-I specifications, including:

- Metadata
  - WS-MetadataExchange
  - WS-Transfer
  - WS-Policy
- Security
  - WS-Security
  - WS-SecureConversation
  - WS-Trust
  - WS-SecurityPolicy
- Messaging
  - WS-ReliableMessaging
  - WS-RMPolicy
- Transactions
  - WS-Coordination
  - WS-AtomicTransaction

== See also ==
- JAX-WS
