= Web Services Invocation Framework =

Apache WSIF
- Developer: Apache Software Foundation
- Stable release: 2.0 / January 27, 2003
- Operating system: Cross-platform
- Type: Web services
- License: Apache License 2.0
- Website: ws.apache.org/wsif

The Web Services Invocation Framework (WSIF) supports a simple and flexible Java API (Application Programming Interface) for invoking any Web Services Description Language (WSDL)-described service.

Using WSIF, WSDL can become the centerpiece of an integration framework for accessing software running on diverse platforms which use different protocols. The software needs to be described using WSDL and have a binding included in its description, that the client's WSIF framework has a provider for. WSIF defines and comes packaged with providers for local Java, Enterprise JavaBeans (EJB), Java Message Service (JMS), and Java EE Connector Architecture (JCA) protocols, which means that a client can define an EJB or a Java Message Service-accessible service directly as a WSDL binding and access it transparently using WSIF, using the same API one would use for a SOAP service or a local Java class.

== See also ==
- Apache XML
