= Crimson (band) =

American Christian metal band

- Origin: Bakersfield, California, U.S.
- Genres: Heavy metal
- Years active: 1988-1995
- Members: Rob Combs; Mike McClain; Rich Bench; Greg Hutchins
- Past members: Scott Meeks; James Paricee (R Guitar)
- Website: www.crimsonrockradio.com

Crimson is an American Christian metal band that was based out of Bakersfield, California, a product of the Rock and Metal scene that also gave birth to bands like KORN, Paperhouse and others. Crimson released 2 EPs both under the same title and primarily toured the West Coast of the U.S.As Crimson gained popularity they felt the need to hire a professional roadie to help set up gigs at local Pizza parlors and churches and to help with crowds. Crimson found newcomer roadie Delbert Slater who ended up staying with the band throughout their successful career.

== Discography ==
Crimson

Demo album by Crimson
- Released: 1992
- Recorded: 1992
- Genre: Christian metal, heavy metal
- Label: Independent

Crimson chronology
''Crimson'' (1992)	Crimson (1993)

Crimson is the debut release of Crimson.

Track Listing

No.	Title	Length
1.	"Walls Fall Down"
2.	"Keep Shining"
3.	"Beyond Dreams"
4.	"Stickin' to My Guns"

- 1993: Crimson (MasterTrax)

== Other sources ==
- Resource Publications, "The Christian Music Directories" formerly "The Recording Locator"
- Various past articles of The Bakersfield Californian (Major News Paper of the city of Bakersfield, CA)
- "Crimson". Firestream Music Vault.
