= Apache Axis =

Web service framework

- Developer: Apache Software Foundation
- Stable release: 2.0.1 / May 18, 2026; 4 months ago
- Written in: C++, Java
- Operating system: Cross-platform
- Type: Web service
- License: Apache License 2.0
- Website: axis.apache.org

Apache Axis (Apache eXtensible Interaction System) is an open-source, XML based Web service framework. It consists of a Java and a C++ implementation of the SOAP server, and various utilities and APIs for generating and deploying Web service applications. Using Apache Axis, developers can create interoperable, distributed computing applications. Axis development takes place under the auspices of the Apache Software Foundation.

== Axis for Java ==
When using the Java version of Axis, there are two ways to expose Java code as Web service. The easiest one is to use Axis native JWS (Java Web Service) files. Another way is to use custom deployment. Custom deployment enables you to customize resources that should be exposed as Web services.

See also Apache Axis2.

=== JWS Web service creation ===
JWS files contain Java class source code that should be exposed as Web service. The main difference between an ordinary java file and jws file is the file extension. Another difference is that jws files are deployed as source code and not compiled class files.

The following example will expose methods add and subtract of class Calculator.

 public class Calculator 
 {
   public int add(int i1, int i2) 
   {
     return i1 + i2; 
   }
 
   public int subtract(int i1, int i2) 
   {
     return i1 - i2;
   }
 }

==== JWS Web service deployment ====
Once the Axis servlet is deployed, you need only to copy the jws file to the Axis directory on the server. This will work if you are using an Apache Tomcat container. In the case that you are using another web container, custom WAR archive creation will be required.

==== JWS Web service access ====
JWS Web service is accessible using the URL http://localhost:8080/axis/Calculator.jws. If you are running a custom configuration of Apache Tomcat or a different container, the URL might be different.

=== Custom deployed Web service ===
Custom Web service deployment requires a specific deployment descriptor called WSDD (Web Service Deployment Descriptor) syntax. It can be used to specify resources that should be exposed as Web services. Current version (1.3) supports

- RPC services
- EJB - stateless (Enterprise Java Bean)

==== Automated generation of WSDL ====
When a Web service is exposed using Axis, it will generate a WSDL file automatically when accessing the Web service URL with ?WSDL appended to it.

== Related technologies ==
- Apache Axis2 - re-design/write of Axis
- Java Web Services Development Pack - web services framework
- Apache CXF - other Apache web services framework (old XFire & Celtix)
- XML Interface for Network Services - RPC/web services framework
- Web Services Invocation Framework - Java API for invoking Web services
- webMethods Glue - commercial web services enabling product
