= Jakarta XML Web Services =

Jakarta EE application programming interface

- Other names: Java API for XML Web Services, JAX-WS
- Original author: Sun Microsystems
- Developer: Eclipse Foundation
- Stable release: 2.3.3 / February 19, 2020; 6 years ago
- Written in: Java
- Operating system: Cross-platform
- Platform: Java
- Type: Application framework
- License: EPL 2.0 or GPL v2 w/Classpath exception
- Website: projects.eclipse.org/projects/ee4j.jaxws
- Repository: github.com/eclipse-ee4j/jax-ws-api

The Jakarta XML Web Services (JAX-WS; formerly Java API for XML Web Services) is a Jakarta EE API for creating web services, particularly SOAP services. JAX-WS is one of the Java XML programming APIs.

== Overview ==
The JAX-WS 2.2 specification JSR 224 defines a standard Java- to-WSDL mapping which determines how WSDL operations are bound to Java methods when a SOAP message invokes a WSDL operation. This Java-to-WSDL mapping determines which Java method gets invoked and how that SOAP message is mapped to the method's parameters.

This mapping also determines how the method's return value gets mapped to the SOAP response.

JAX-WS uses annotations, introduced in Java SE 5, to simplify the development and deployment of web service clients and endpoints. It is part of the Java Web Services Development Pack. JAX-WS can be used in Java SE starting with version 6. As of Java SE 11, JAX-WS was removed. For details, see JEP 320.

JAX-WS 2.0 replaced the JAX-RPC API in Java Platform, Enterprise Edition 5 which leans more towards document style Web Services.

This API provides the core of Eclipse Metro.

JAX-WS also is one of the foundations of WSIT.

== Standards Supported ==
- JAX-WS 2.0/2.1/2.2 (JSR 224)
- WS-I Basic Profile 1.2 and 2.0
- WS-I Attachments Profile 1.0
- WS-I Simple SOAP Binding Profile 1.0
- WS-Addressing 1.0 - Core, SOAP Binding, WSDL Binding

== Main JWS Packages ==
Package	Description
javax.xml.ws	Has the Core JAX-WS APIs
javax.xml.ws.http	Has APIs specific to XML/HTTP Binding
javax.xml.ws.soap	Has APIs specific to SOAP/HTTP Binding
javax.xml.ws.handler	Has APIs for message handlers
javax.xml.ws.spi	defines SPIs for JAX-WS
javax.xml.ws.spi.http	Provides HTTP SPI that is used for portable deployment of JAX-WS in containers
javax.xml.ws.wsaddressing	Has APIs related to WS-Addressing
javax.jws	Has APIs specific to Java to WSDL mapping annotations
javax.jws.soap	Has APIs for mapping the Web Service onto the SOAP protocol

== XML Web Services related Specs ==
Java EE 7
Specification	Version	Stds. Body	JSR/Url
JAX-WS	2.3	JCP	224
Web Services	1.3	JCP	109
WS Metadata	2.1	JCP	181
JAXB	2.2	JCP	222
SAAJ	1.3	JCP	67
SOAP	1.2	W3C	soap
XML	1.1	W3C	xml
WSDL	1.1	W3C	wsdl

=== Jakarta Web Services Metadata ===
Jakarta Web Services Metadata (JWS; formerly Web Services Metadata for Java platform and Java Web Services), as a part of Jakarta XML Web Services (JAX-WS), is a Java programming language specification (JSR-181) primarily used to standardize the development of web service interfaces for the Jakarta EE platform. Version is 2.1 was released on December 15, 2009.

== Implementations ==
- Eclipse Metro in Eclipse Enterprise for Java (EE4J)
- Apache CXF
- Apache Axis2
- JBossWS in WildFly
- IBM WebSphere Jax-Ws in WebSphere
- Oracle Weblogic
