= Aeronautical Fixed Telecommunication Network =

Worldwide system of aeronautical fixed circuits

The Aeronautical Fixed Telecommunications Network (AFTN) is a worldwide system of aeronautical fixed circuits provided, as part of the Aeronautical Fixed Service, for the exchange of messages and/or digital data between aeronautical fixed stations having the same or compatible communications characteristics. AFTN comprises aviation entities including: ANS (Air Navigation Services) providers, aviation service providers, airport authorities and government agencies, to name a few. It exchanges vital information for aircraft operations such as distress messages, urgency messages, flight safety messages, meteorological messages, flight regularity messages and aeronautical administrative messages.

== Communications infrastructure ==
The original AFTN infrastructure consisted of landline teleprinter links between the major centers. Some long distance and international links were based on duplex radioteletype transmissions and leased lines. When it upgraded to CIDIN (Common ICAO Data Interchange Network), it was upgraded to X.25 links at much higher data rates. As the Aeronautical Message Handling System (AMHS) comes online over the next decade, it will switch to X.400 links, with either dedicated lines or tunneled through IP.

IWXXM messages are lengthy and contain characters not supported by AFTN, so cannot use AFTN equipment. IWXXM requires the use of AMHS for international exchange.

== AFTN Station address format ==
An AFTN address is an eight-letter-group composed of a four-letter ICAO Location Indicator plus a three-letter-group identifying an organization or service addressed and an additional letter. The additional letter represents a department, division or process within the organization/function addressed. The letter X is used to complete the address when an explicit identification of the department, division or process is not required. For instance: LEBBYNYX.

Location Indicator - A four-letter code group formulated in accordance with rules prescribed by ICAO and assigned to the location of an aeronautical fixed station. In the ICAO DOC7910, location indicators that are assigned to locations to which messages can not be addressed over the AFTN are identified by an asterisk(*)

The four-letter Location Indicators are listed in ICAO Doc 7910 — Location Indicators. The three-letter designators are listed in ICAO Doc 8585 — Designators for Aircraft Operating Agencies, Aeronautical Authorities and Services.

Every location (airport or other facility) with a connection to the AFS is assigned a unique four letter code (the aeronautical location indicator) by ICAO. The first letter or two letters indicate the country and the remaining two or three letters the specific location. For instance the letter K is the first letter of the four letter ICAO address location within the continental United States. The first letter for a Canadian aerodrome, or airport address, is C. Southern Europe codes begin with L, and specifically codes in Spain with LE. For example, New York's John F. Kennedy airport is KJFK while Goose Bay Canada's airport is identified as CYYR and Bilbao in Spain as LEBB.

Some irregular four-letter codes, not assigned by ICAO, do exist and appear usually in meteorological reports.

Examples for some common three-letter-groups used in AFTN addresses in order to identify an organization or service:

Facility code	refers to
YFYX	"AFTN Office"
ZTZX	"Control tower"
ZPZX	"ATS Reporting Office"
ZQZX	"Area Control Center"
YNYX	"Notam Office"
YDYX	"Airport Manager"
YZYX	"Met Data Bank"
YMYX	"Local Met Office"
ZRZA	"Radar Approach"
YXYX	"Military Aerodrome"

Therefore the address LEBBYNYX indicates the NOTAM office of Bilbao Airport, Spain.

== AFTN Message Format ==
The message format of AFTN messages is defined in ICAO Annex 10 Aeronautical Telecommunications Volume II.

AFTN messages consist of a Heading, the Message Text and a message Ending.

The message Heading comprises a Heading Line, the Address and the Origin. The Heading Line comprises the Start-of-Message Signal which is the four characters ZCZC, the Transmission Identification, an Additional Service Indication (if necessary) and a Spacing Signal.

The AFTN Address comprises Alignment Functions, a two-letter Priority Indicator depending on the message category and an eight-letter group (Addressee Indicator). The first four letters of the eight-letter group is a Location Indicator indicating the place of destination. The following three-letter group indicates the organization or function addressed (for instance aeronautical authority, service or aircraft operating agency). The last letter of the eight-letter represents a department, division or process within the organization/function addressed.

The Origin consists of message Filing Time (six-digit date-time-group), the Originator Indicator (eight-letter group) identifying the message originator, a Priority Alarm (used only in teletypewriter operation for Distress Messages) and Alignment Functions.

The Message Text ends with the End-of-Message Signal, which is the four characters NNNN. The Ending itself comprises twelve letter shift signals which represent also a Message-Separation Signal.

The AFTN system is backwards compatible with older transmission technology as many member states do not upgrade their AFTN centers fast enough. The message format betrays the extensive use of radioteletype links in the past. A typical message would look like:

ZCZC LAA005 12032000
DD OPKCZQZX
120900 OPSTZQZX

MESSAGE TEXT

NNNN

Explanations:

- The first three lines in the example AFTN message above represent the Heading of the message.
- ZCZC LAA005 12032000 is the Heading Line in which ZCZC is the Start-of-Message Signal. The Z and C characters do not normally occur together in standard text and provide a unique character pattern for automating the identification of the beginning of a message. LAA005 refers to the Transmission Identification and 12032000 is an Additional Service Indication.
- The second line DD OPKCZQZX is the Address of the message. DD represents the Priority Indicator for the message category(an Urgency Message in this cases). OPKCZQZX is the eight-letter group identifying the addressee. OPKC refers to Karachi/Jinnah Intl, Pakistan. ZQZ refers to a Centre in Charge of Flight Information Region or Upper Flight Information Region'. In other words, the addressee is Karachi Area Control Centre or Karachi Flight Information Centre. The last character X indicates that an explicit identification of the organization or function addressed is not required. So the X is just used to complete the originator address.
- The third line 120900 OPSTZQZX represents the Origin of the message. 120900 refers to the date-time-group and means the twelfth day of the month at time 09 o'clock UTC. OPSTZQZX is the originator of the message where OPSTZQZX refers to Area Control Centre or Flight Information Centre at Sialkot, Pakistan.
- The example does not give an explicit MESSAGE TEXT. In reality the contents of the message is included here.
- The Ending of the message is indicated by NNNN which is the End-of-Message Signal that also has a character pattern that is not found in standard text.
- The Alignment Functions and letter shift signals mentioned above are not visible in AFTN messages.

The message routing is easily automated by general purpose computers. Teleprinter communication with airline operators is sometimes maintained by having a connection to the IATA Type B messaging networks which use a 7 character address. The whole communications system is still rooted in the 'official' nature of radioteletypes.

The older tape stations (and perhaps newer ones) also included a bell that could be rung by using a set character code. The purpose of the bell was to allow the sender to alert the receiving operator of a high priority message such as an SS message. It was also possible to insert spacing between bell rings. With care and persistence, one could compose a musical tune to play to far distant stations. Jingle bells was a favourite. A particularly clever 'author' could combine the tune with an image such as a Christmas tree. The skill for this was often learnt on those long night watches when little traffic was in the air.

Other airport required reports are also transmitted through the AFTN, on daily and hourly intervals like flight plans, NOTAMs (notices to airmen), and AIRADs (Airfield Advisories).

== Message Categories ==
Via the AFTN the following message categories are submitted:

- distress messages;
- urgency messages;
- flight safety messages;
- meteorological messages;
- flight regularity messages;
- aeronautical information services (AIS) messages;
- aeronautical administrative messages;
- service messages.

== Priority Indicators ==
Priority Indicators consist of two letters SS, DD, FF, GG and KK. They are assigned depending on the messages category as follows:

- Priority Indicator SS for Distress Messages
- Priority Indicator DD for Urgency Messages
- Priority Indicator FF for Flight Safety Messages
- Priority Indicator GG for Meteorological Messages, Flight Regularity Messages and Aeronautical Information Services Messages
- Priority Indicator KK for Aeronautical Administrative Messages
- Priority Indicator used for Service Messages are assigned as considered appropriate by the originator, but most likely KK is used

== Order of Priority ==
The Priority Indicator is used to transmit AFTN messages according to their Order of Priority. So messages with Priority Indicator SS have the highest transmission priority. Messages with Priority Indicator DD and FF have the second highest transmission priority and the remaining messages with Priority Indicator GG and KK the lowest.
