= Mortgage Electronic Registration Systems =

American company

Mortgage Electronic Registration Systems, Inc.
- Type: Privately held company
- Industry: Financial services
- Founded: 1995
- Headquarters: Reston, Virginia, United States
- Area served: United States
- Products: MERS System, MERS eRegistry, MERS Commercial
- Parent: Intercontinental Exchange
- Website: mersinc.org

Mortgage Electronic Registration Systems, Inc. (MERS) is an American privately held corporation. MERS is a separate and distinct corporation that serves as a nominee on mortgages after the turn of the century and is owned by holding company MERSCORP Holdings, Inc., which owns and operates an electronic registry known as the MERS system, which is designed to track servicing rights and ownership of mortgages in the United States. According to the Department of the Treasury, the Board of Governors of the Federal Reserve, The Federal Deposit Insurance Corporation and the Federal Housing Finance Agency, MERS is an agent for lenders without any reference to MERS as a principal. On October 5, 2018, Intercontinental Exchange (NYSE: ICE) and MERS announced that ICE had acquired all of MERS.

== History ==
The current Mortgage Electronic Registration Systems, Inc. is the third generation of companies with the same name established as of 1/1/1999. The original "MERS" was simply the acronym of Mortgage Electronic Registration Systems, Inc., in 1995. In 1997, Mortgage Electronic Registration Systems, Inc. registered "MERS" as a service mark with the United States Patent and Trademark Office (USPTO) for its mortgage loan eRegistry system. The original corporation has since merged with other entities created by its executives and board of directors.

Although the 1995 Mortgage Electronic Registration Systems, Inc. (version #1) created the MERS service mark and system, it no longer existed after the name change to MERSCORP, Inc. as of 1/1/1999 and then again to MERSCORP Holdings, Inc. on 2/27/2012 which is the owner and operator of the eRegistry but is not disclosed in mortgages.

Real estate law and real estate transactions in the US are subject to state regulations and county level recordation requirements. That made it quite cumbersome for financial companies to develop a smooth operation of a market based on mortgages in the early 1980s. This is because every time a financial instrument containing mortgages is sold, various state laws may require that the sale of each such mortgage (or deed of trust) be recorded in the local county courts in order to preserve certain rights (e.g., the right to foreclose non-judicially), which triggers an obligation to pay corresponding recording fees. So, the financial industry, eager to trade in mortgage-backed securities, needed to find a way around these recordation requirements, and this is how the MERS system was born to replace public recordation with a private one. Nevertheless, MERS describes its activities as complementing public land recording systems. "The MERS® System is the only national database that provides free public access to servicer information for registered home mortgages, complementing public land recording systems that have their origins in centuries old real property laws." By 2007, MERSCORP Holdings, Inc. registered some two-thirds of all the home loans in the US.

Mortgage Electronic Registration Systems, Inc. (#3 1999 version) is the owner of record (or the owner's nominee) of the security interest arising from mortgages extended by lenders, investors and their loan servicers and recorded in county land records. By using MERS, the lenders and investors who are the real parties in interest avoid the need to file assignments in county land records, which lowers costs for lenders and, they claim, consumers by reducing county recording fee expenses resulting from real estate transfers and provides a central source of information and tracking for mortgage loans. MERSCORP Holdings, Inc.'s role in facilitating mortgage trading was relatively uncontroversial in its early days, but continued fallout from the subprime mortgage crisis has placed the firm at the center of several legal challenges disputing the company's right to initiate foreclosures. Should these challenges succeed, the US banking industry could face a renewed need for capitalization.

The issue of the ownership of the MERS system is blurred between the entities to the point that courts tend to confuse the eRegistry system with the nominee because they use the same "MERS" acronym. The MERS system is purported to have fulfilled the “Safe Harbor” requirements in the state-led Uniform Electronic Transactions Act (UETA) and E-SIGN (Electronic Signatures in Global and National Commerce Act of 2000) adopted by Congress in the documents filed by MERSCORP, Inc. nka MERSCORP Holdings, Inc. with the United States Trademark and Patent Office. However, it is unclear how the MERS system obtains the documents from Mortgage Electronic Registration Systems, Inc. (#3 1999 version).

== MERSCORP Holdings, Inc.'s MERS System ==
Mortgage Electronic Registration Systems, Inc. began as a project in October 1993 when Fannie Mae, Freddie Mac, and Ginnie Mae produced a White Paper (with assistance from law firm Covington & Burling) about the need for an electronic mortgage registration system. The MERS acronym was coined soon thereafter. The Mortgage Bankers Association got involved and MERS was incorporated in October 1995. MERS awarded a contract to Electronic Data Systems (EDS) to develop and service the technology systems, and MERS was officially launched in April 1997.

Mortgage Electronic Registration Systems, Inc. was intended to serve as a nominee for real estate transactions in a way strongly analogous to how Cede & Co. serves as the nominee owner of record (i.e., the "street name" owner) for all securities held in trust by the Depository Trust & Clearing Corporation. In the late 1960s and early 1970s, the American securities industry was drowning in paper because of the sheer complexity of physically exchanging thousands of stock certificates every day. By "immobilizing" physical stock certificates and later replacing them altogether with book entries, DTCC enabled the development of the modern computerized securities industry.

As mortgage-backed securities grew in volume during the 1980s, it became self-evident that a similar mechanism was needed for the mortgages placed into those securities. The underlying problem is that a mortgage loan transferred into an MBS (Mortgage-Backed Security) must become "bankruptcy remote" from the originating lender. That is, in the event the originating lender collapsed (as ultimately happened during the 2008 financial crisis to many such lenders), MBS investors demanded some kind of protection to ensure that the lender's own creditors could not "avoid" (in bankruptcy terms, rollback) the transfer of the loans into the MBS as fraudulent conveyances and suck them back into the lender's bankruptcy estate. The easiest way to create such protection is to simply convey the loan for consideration through three or four entities before it reaches the MBS issuing entity. As noted above, each of those conveyances had to be recorded with the relevant recorder or land registry. With each loan requiring three or four assignments, and hundreds of mortgage loans going into each MBS, the result was that recorders were flooded with assignments, and investment banks found themselves choking on paperwork and recorders' fees. MERS system fixed this problem in that most standard loan documents were changed to name MERS as the nominal beneficiary or mortgagee of record. This enabled lenders and investors to transfer mortgages without recording assignments in local recorders' offices and in turn avoided having to pay recording fees.

Ideally, assuming a loan is properly paid back on time, a MERS loan needs only two documents to be recorded: the original mortgage or deed of trust naming Mortgage Electronic Registration Systems, Inc., and a reconveyance of the mortgage or deed of trust back to the borrower (thus merging legal and equitable title). If all entities along the way are MERSCORP Holdings, Inc. members, then all intermediate transfers between those points are tracked only on the MERS system, and the entity who holds the loan at the end merely records the reconveyance as an agent for MERSCORP Holdings, Inc. (Notice how MERS is both (1) an agent for the original lender, and then (2) the final lender acts as an agent for MERSCORP Holdings, Inc.; this is why MERS' critics frequently attack it as "two-faced.") If the borrower defaults, the loan servicer will record an assignment on behalf of Mortgage Electronic Registration Systems, Inc. to the real party in interest (i.e., an investment bank in its capacity as trustee for a MBS) and initiate foreclosure. Whereas before the MERS system that last assignment would always have been recorded at the time the MBS was created, the MERS system enabled banks to avoid having to record it unless and until (1) foreclosure became necessary or (2) the loan was sold by the MBS trustee to an entity outside of the MERS system owned by MERSCORP Holdings, Inc. If the loan performs to the very end, the assignment never needs to be recorded.

MERS system serves several other purposes. It enables consumers, title companies and other real estate professionals to easily identify the current holders of registered mortgages and obtain discharges despite any transfers of the mortgages or mergers or acquisitions of the lenders and investors in interest that may otherwise make it difficult to trace ownership, if it is accurately maintained by the MERSCORP Holdings, Inc. membership. Information contained in the MERS system can help to identify possible mortgage fraud involving the identity of a prospective buyer and owner-occupancy issues. The centralized database of MERS system can also help detect property flipping schemes and purchases, again if it is accurately maintained, a common criticism of the MERS system scheme.

== Mortgage identification number ==
Originated by MERSCORP Holdings, Inc.'s MERS system, the mortgage identification number (MIN) is a unique 18-digit number used to track a mortgage loan throughout its life, from origination to securitization to payoff or foreclosure. In general, the first 7 digits uniquely identify the loan servicer, and the remaining 11 digits are used internally by the servicer, typically as the loan number.

== ServicerID ==
Through MERS system ServicerID, homeowners can search for their mortgage servicer, regardless of whether the mortgage has changed hands since the loan was originated. By identifying the loan servicer, homeowners may seek to identify their lender to initiate negotiations for revised mortgage terms and take actions that can avoid foreclosure.

== The MERSCORP Holdings, Inc. MERS system eRegistry ==
The MERS system eRegistry is a system of record that identifies the owner (Controller) and custodian (Location) for registered eNotes. The owner is also described as the Investor. "Investor -- As it pertains to the MERS® eRegistry, the entity that is the owner of the Mortgage Loan represented by the eNote." Built by MERSCORP Holdings, Inc. with the endorsement of the Mortgage Bankers Association (MBA) and launched in 2004, the MERS system eRegistry allegedly satisfies the "safe harbor" requirements of E-SIGN and UETA legislation. Both Fannie Mae and Freddie Mac require the registration of eNotes on the MERS system eRegistry before they are eligible for purchase.

== MISMO and MERS ==
In February 2009, MERSCORP Holdings, Inc.'s MERS system was selected to manage the day-to-day operations of the Mortgage Industry Standards Maintenance Organization (MISMO), although the MBA was to continue its full control over MISMO.

== 2010 foreclosure crisis ==
=== Litigation and major legal decisions ===
The blur of the actual identities of the "MERS" related entities has led to confusion within the court system and foreclosure process.

==== Mortgage Electronic Registration Systems, Inc. v. Lisa Marie Chong, et al. (United States District Court, District of Nevada) ====
On December 4, 2009, Judge Dawson found that "MERS provided no evidence that it was the agent or nominee for the current owner of the beneficial interest in the note, it has failed to meet its burden of establishing that it is a real party in interest with standing." He issued his decision in 5 of the 18 cases (In re Chong, In re Politics, In re Cortes, In re Medina and In re O'Dell) on appeal but declined to hold that "MERS would not be able to establish itself as a real party in interest had it identified the holder of the note or provided sufficient evidence of the source of its authority."

==== Cervantes v. Countrywide Home Loans Inc. (United States District Court, District of Arizona) ====
On September 24, 2009, the U.S. District Court for the District of Arizona, in Cervantes v. Countrywide Home Loans, Inc., et al., dismissed all federal and state law claims made by three borrowers in a complaint filed against a group of defendants that included MERS. The court discussed whether MERS was a proper beneficiary but only in the context of whether its involvement constituted the tort of fraud on the borrowers. The court found the mere use of MERS was not common law fraud on the borrowers, finding that "Plaintiffs have failed to allege what effect, if any, listing the MERS system as a 'sham' beneficiary on the deed of trust had upon their obligations as borrowers."

The U.S. Court of Appeals for the Ninth Circuit affirmed the trial court's judgment in favor of MERS in a published opinion filed on September 7, 2011. The Court ruled that a borrower had no basis to challenge the standing of an entity like MERS. It also, however, drew attention to a legal reference book's footnote that such a borrower still had a remedy by suing to have the trustee's sale set aside.

==== Mortgage Electronic Registration Systems, Inc. v. Revoredo, et al. (Florida Third District Court of Appeals) ====
Both the 3rd District Court of Appeals in Miami and the 2nd District Court of Appeals in Lakeland held that MERS can foreclose. Senior Judge Alan R. Schwartz noted the decision was based in part in the changes in finance and technology over time. "The problem arises from the difficulty of attempting to shoehorn a modern innovative instrument of commerce into nomenclature and legal categories which stem essentially from the medieval English land law," Schwartz wrote.

A related Florida case is BONY Mellon v. Pino. After homeowner Pino had established that bank paperwork was defective, BONY moved to dismiss its own suit, presumably intending to remedy the paperwork and then start a second suit for foreclosure, Florida being a judicial foreclosure state. Pino challenged the bank's right to dismiss its own suit in such a way. As the case neared a hearing at the Florida supreme court, the parties settled. Days later the bank recorded notice at the country recorder that Pino was now the free and clear owner of his house. In other words, the bank let go of its claim, presumably worth many thousands of dollars, to Pino's house, because bank attorneys believed they were likely to lose at the state supreme court, and thus establish a precedent that could cost them a lot of money. Avoiding the precedent was worth more than the lost money lent to Pino. In spite of the bank's action, the court decided to hear the matter to rule on the propriety of the banks "dismiss-fix-sue again" approach. (Brittany Davis, Miami Herald blog, May 10, 2012)

==== Jewelean Jackson, et al. v. Mortgage Electronic Registration Systems, Inc. (Minnesota Supreme Court) ====
On August 14, 2009, the Minnesota Supreme Court ruled that MERS could foreclose under state law as the mortgagee of record.

A class-action lawsuit was filed by homeowners in Delaware to hold MERS responsible for fraudulent fees on foreclosures filed by MERS.

Homeowners have argued in court that their homes could not be foreclosed because MERS deeds of trust were unlawful. In other cases, state appellate courts have held that MERS is permitted to foreclose mortgage liens when it is the holder of the note and mortgage.

==== Landmark Nat'l Bank v. Kesler (Kansas Supreme Court) ====
On August 28, 2009, the Kansas Supreme Court in Landmark National Bank v. Kesler, 2009 Kan. LEXIS 834 (Aug 28, 2009), issued a decision involving MERS that focused on finality of judgments. MERS's involvement with this case arose from the fact that the company did not receive notice of a foreclosure action even though MERS was the mortgagee of record on a junior lien. In the opinion, the court noted that "[e]ven if MERS was technically entitled to notice and service in the initial foreclosure action—an issue that we do not decide at this time—we are not compelled to conclude that the trial court abused its discretion in denying the motions to vacate default judgment and require joinder of MERS…." The case did not affect MERS's standing to foreclose and the company is entitled to receive notice of legal actions when MERS is the mortgagee. The court concluded that MERS had not publicly recorded the chain of title with the relevant registers of deeds in counties across Kansas. The judges determined that a mortgage contract consists of two documents: a deed of trust (which secures the property as collateral) and the promissory note (which indents the borrower to the lender), and determined that "in the event that the mortgage loan somehow separates interests of the note and the deed of trust... with the deed of trust lying with some independent entity... the mortgage may become unenforceable."

On April 30, 2010, a Kansas appellate court in MERS, Inc. v. Graham, 44 Kan. App. 2d 547, 2010 WL 1873567, at **4-**5, interpreted Kesler to mean that MERS in fact does not have standing to foreclose on a mortgage in Kansas where there is no mention of MERS in the promissory note, MERS acts solely as a "nominee" for the lender, and there is no evidence that the promissory note has been assigned to MERS or that MERS otherwise possesses an interest in the promissory note.

==== MERSCORP, Inc., RESPA Litigation (United States Court of Appeals for the Fifth Circuit) ====
In 2008, the United States Court of Appeals for the Fifth Circuit dismissed a multi-district class action lawsuit against MERS. The plaintiffs alleged that a small fee charged by mortgage lenders, which was then paid to MERS, violated provisions in the Real Estate Settlement Procedures Act (RESPA). The plaintiffs also argued that MERS unfairly received business referrals from the mortgage lenders. However, the Circuit Judges held that "In exchange for the fee, MERS performed the service of being the permanent record mortgagee in the public land records..." Plaintiffs' complaint was dismissed by the appellate court for failure to state a claim under RESPA.

==== District of Columbia Attorney General's Enforcement Statement ====
On October 27, 2010, DC Attorney General Peter Nickels issued a statement which concludes that "a fore closuring may not be commenced against a D.C. homeowner unless the security interest of the current noteholder is properly supported by public filings with the District's Recorder of Deeds." So in Nickels' view, subsequent transfers of the mortgage on MERS's records will not count unless they were also recorded in D.C.

==== Gomes v. Countrywide Home Loans (California Court of Appeal for the Fourth Appellate District, Division One) ====
On February 18, 2011, the California Court of Appeal for the Fourth Appellate District affirmed the sustaining of a demurrer without leave to amend. In an opinion by Justice Joan Irion, the court ruled in favor of MERS in two ways: (1) California's nonjudicial foreclosure statutes did not expressly or impliedly allow a lawsuit simply to determine whether the party initiating a foreclosure was authorized to do so; and (2) even if they did, the plaintiff consented to the use of MERS to initiate the foreclosure when he signed the deed of trust. Gomes expressly cited to and relied upon the state supreme court's 2010 decision in Lu v. Hawaiian Gardens Casino, Inc., which clarified that a certain conservative method of statutory analysis (first articulated by Associate Justice Frank K. Richardson in 1979 and adopted by a majority of the court in a 1988 opinion by Chief Justice Malcolm M. Lucas) applies to all California statutes, not just the California Insurance Code. Thus, if the California Legislature has not expressly written a cause of action into a statute, it simply does not exist. The Supreme Court of California denied Gomes's petition for review on May 18, 2011. Gomes' attorney then filed a petition for writ of certiorari in the U.S. Supreme Court in which he attempted to challenge MERS on vaguely articulated due process federal constitutional grounds not previously raised in the lower courts. However, he failed to challenge the constitutionality of the California rule for finding an implied cause of action, which would likely have failed anyway, as the federal rule for finding an implied cause of action is nearly identical. The high court denied the petition on October 11, 2011.

==== In re Agard (U.S. Bankruptcy Court, Eastern District of New York) ====
On February 10, 2011, the U.S. Bankruptcy Court for the Eastern District of New York considered a motion for relief from the bankruptcy stay brought by U.S. Bank as the trustee of a securitization trust. U.S. Bank claimed the right to foreclose on the debtor's mortgage in part because of purported assignment of the mortgage from MERS. The court found itself constrained by the Rooker-Feldman doctrine to give effect to a prior state-court judgment of foreclosure, but went on to consider several arguments MERS advanced about its legal status and authority, noting that it had held off on deciding dozens of additional cases until those matters were clarified. The court found that MERS had no power as an agent to assign the mortgage under its rules, its membership agreement, or the terms of the mortgage itself. The court also found that MERS had no power as the mortgagee of record to assign the mortgage: "MERS's position that that it can be both the mortgagee and an agent of the mortgagee is absurd, at best."

The court observed,

MERS and its partners made the decision to create and operate under a business model that was designed large part to avoid the requirements of the traditional mortgage recording process. The Court does not accept the argument that because MERS may be involved with 50% of all residential mortgages in the country, that is reason enough for this Court to turn a blind eye to the fact that this process does not comply with the law.

==== Residential Funding v. Saurman (Michigan Supreme Court) ====
In April 2011, in Residential Funding v. Saurman, the Michigan Court of Appeals decided two consolidated cases holding that MERS did not have standing to foreclose non-judicially pursuant to MCL 600.3204(1)(d) because it did not actually own any interest in the debt. The Michigan Supreme Court reversed the decision in an order November 16, 2011, finding that MERS is the owner of an interest in the mortgage because "[MERS'] contractual obligations as mortgagee were dependent upon whether the mortgagor met the obligation to pay the indebtedness which the mortgage secured." However, the court clarified that MERS's status as an "owner of an interest in the indebtedness" does not equate to an ownership interest in the note.

On November 16, 2011, the Michigan Supreme Court, understanding the urgency and potential fallout of this matter, issued a peremptory order, in lieu of granting the appeal, and reversed the Court of Appeals judgment. (Residential Funding Co, LLC v Saurman, 2011 WL 5588929 (Mich, November 1, 2011)). The court agreed with the dissenting Court of Appeals opinion, "pursuant to MCL 600.3204(1)(d), Mortgage Electronic Registration System (MERS) is the 'owner . . . of an interest in the indebtedness secured by the mortgage at issue in each of these consolidated cases' because '[MERS] contractual obligations as the mortgagee were dependent upon whether the mortgagor met the obligation to pay the indebtedness which the mortgage secured.'" The Court clarified that "MERS status as an 'owner of an interest in the indebtedness' does not equate to an ownership interest in the note. Rather, as a record-holder of the mortgage, MERS owned a security lien on the property, the continued existence of which was contingent upon the satisfaction of the indebtedness." This interest in the indebtedness . . . authorized MERS to foreclosure by advertisement under MCL 600.3204(1)(d)."

The court's interpreted MCL 600.3204(1) as inclusive rather than exclusive. The court held those with an "interest in the indebtedness" includes mortgagees of record (such as MERS) and constitutes a category of parties entitled to foreclose by advertisement, along with those who "own the indebtedness" and those who "act as the servicing agent of the mortgage."

==== Calvo v. HSBC (Court of Appeals of California, Second District, Division Eight) ====
On September 12, 2011, the California Court of Appeal for the Second District said the complaint (an alleged violation of Section 2932.5 of the California Code which requires the assignee of a mortgagee to record an assignment before exercising a power to sell real property) was irrelevant as it applied only to mortgages, not to deeds of trust.

==== Robinson v. Countrywide (Court of Appeals of California, Fourth District) ====
On September 12, the Fourth District Court citing its own May decision in Gomes v. Countrywide, stated that "the statutory scheme...does not provide for a preemptive suit challenging standing. Consequently, plaintiffs' claims for damages for wrongful initiation of foreclosure and for declaratory relief based on plaintiffs' interpretation of section 2924, subdivision (a), do not state a cause of action as a matter of law."

==== Bain vs. Metropolitan Mortgage Group, Inc. (Washington Supreme Court) ====
In March 2012, Kristin Bain of Tukwila, WA filed suit against MERS (and a subsidiary) for foreclosing on her house without even disclosing the actual owner of her mortgage.

In August 2012, the Washington Supreme Court ruled with Bain, saying that MERS was not a lawful beneficiary of her deed and did not have the right to appoint trustees. The decision states: "A plain reading of the statute leads us to conclude that only the actual holder of the promissory note or other instrument evidencing the obligation may be a beneficiary with the power to appoint a trustee to proceed with a nonjudicial foreclosure on real property. Simply put, if MERS does not hold the note, it is not a lawful beneficiary".

=== Electronic signatures and notarizations ===
Because the MERS system is electronic, it depends on the electronic storage and transmission of legal documents. On the question of notarization of electronic signatures and the honoring of notarized signatures across state lines, the US House of Representatives had passed bills to legalize these steps, and in 2010 the US Senate passed the legislation without debate. However, President Barack Obama publicly opposed the legislation on October 7, 2010. As a result, the bill died, and state laws govern whether electronic signatures can be notarized or whether a notarized signature in one state must be accepted in another.

== Controversy ==
Mortgage Electronic Registration Systems, Inc. has generated much debate, controversy, and criticism among litigators and academics in "some of the most widely read law review articles of the past few years." Dustin A. Zacks, for example, criticized Mortgage Electronic Registration Systems, Inc. for taking directly inconsistent positions in various courts around the country. Zacks' article found favor with the Bain Court which cited him for the proposition that "MERS's officers often issue assignments without verifying the underlying information, which has resulted in incorrect or fraudulent transfers." Professor Christopher Peterson has similarly argued that MERS is disingenuous in simultaneously claiming to be the mortgagee and the nominee/agent of the lender or trustee. Peterson likened this alleged duplicity to being akin to the two-faced Roman God Janus, while Zacks compared Mortgage Electronic Registration Systems, Inc. to a "creature more akin to a many-tentacled squid." Peterson's articles on MERS, which also criticize MERS for its allegedly harmful effect on the integrity and transparency of public recording, have been cited by countless anti-MERS litigants and in decisions both adverse and favorable to MERS.

Other academics have criticized Mortgage Electronic Registration Systems, Inc. on the grounds that its nominal ownership of millions of home loans poses a disastrous risk for mortgage investors should Mortgage Electronic Registration Systems, Inc. ever declare bankruptcy. Such a bankruptcy could mean that mortgages would "pass into the company's bankruptcy estate and become available to satisfy creditors' claims." One law professor even suggested scrapping the MERS system entirely, replacing it with an entirely new national recording system.
