= Aeronautical Message Handling System =

Aeronautical ground to ground messaging systems

ATS Message Handling System (AMHS) is a standard ATSMHS (or Air Traffic Services Message Handling Services) application for aeronautical fixed communications (e.g. for the transmission of NOTAM, flight plans or meteorological data) based on X.400 profiles. It has been defined by the ICAO.

IWXXM requires the use of AMHS for international exchange.

== Levels of service ==
ICAO Doc 9880 Part II defines two fundamental levels of service within the ATSMHS;

- Basic ATSMHS and
- the Extended ATSMHS.

Additionally, ICAO Doc 9880 (Part II, section 3.4) outlines different subsets of the Extended ATSMHS. The Basic ATSMHS performs an operational role similar to the Aeronautical Fixed Telecommunication Network with a few enhancements. The Extended ATSMHS provided enhanced features but includes the Basic level of service capability; in this way it is ensured that users with Extended Service capabilities can inter-operate, at a basic level, with users having Basic Service capabilities and vice versa.

The ATSMHS is provided by a set of end systems, which collectively comprise the ATS Message Handling System. The systems co-operate to provide users (human or automated) with a data communication service. The AMHS network is composed of interconnected ATS Message Servers that perform message switching at the application layer (Layer 7 in the OSI model).

Direct users connect to ATS Message Servers by means of ATS Message User Agents. An ATS Message User Agent supporting the Extended level of service will use the Basic level of service to allow communication with users who only support the Basic ATSMHS.

== Interoperability ==
In order to ensure unobstructed communication between the ANSPs, the European Air Navigation Planning Group (EANPG) of ICAO has defined 59 test cases in its EUR AMHS Manual (V5.0), 17/06/2010 (Appendix D, AMHS Conformance Tests), ASIA/PAC AMHS Manual (Annex B, AMHS Conformance and Compatibility Test, V2.0, 22/09/08) which have to be performed prior to establishment of bilateral links between the ANSPs. Those tests are conducted using a test engine (AMHS Conformance Test Tool) and verify the conformance to the AMHS standard, which is defined in ICAO Doc 9880-AN/466: Manual on Detailed Technical Specifications for the Aeronautical Telecommunication Network (ATN) using ISO/OSI Standards and Protocols, Second Advanced Edition - 2016, Part II.

In the context of Single European Sky (SES) initiative and the European regulation EC552/2004 EUROCONTROL developed a specification to complement the regulation. The use of the specifications facilitates the demonstration of conformity to the essential requirements and regulatory provisions.

== Implementations ==
In order to facilitate the transition from legacy protocols to this new standard EUROCONTROL launched a project called ECG (European or EATM Communications Gateway) to develop a gateway between AFTN and AMHS. The ECG was developed by the French manufacturer THALES and the German manufacturer FREQUENTIS COMSOFT. Meanwhile, nearly all AMHS systems in Europe are derived from the ECG (see table below).

Similar solutions are offered by Indra Avitech GmbH (Germany), Intelcan (Canada), TELEFONICA (Spain), IDS AirNav (Italy, Canada), Copperchase Ltd (UK), Radiocom (USA) working together with Skysoft Servicios S.A. (Argentina) and FREQUENTIS (Austria).

The first AMHS system was implemented by Avitech GmbH (Germany) as a pioneer solution and went into operational use in 1996 with 36 centers for the German Military (Bundeswehr) and the first AMHS connection in Europe is in operational use since February 2005 between the ANSPs of Germany and Spain. Second in Europe were Bosnia and Herzegovina with Austria in 2011. The first operational AMHS connection in the Middle East was established in 2009 between the United Arab Emirates (Abu Dhabi) and Oman. In the meantime Abu Dhabi has evolved as a nucleus for the introduction of AMHS in the Middle East, resulting in a coherent AMHS network of operational connection between UAE, Jordan, Egypt, Saudi Arabia, Oman and Qatar. Since 2010 Jordan, Egypt and Saudi Arabia form the first operational AMHS triangle. In 2012 the South American countries Peru and Colombia joined the circle of AMHS users while Asia has operated AMHS links between Hong Kong and Macao since 2009 and between Singapore and India since 2011.

Interregional AMHS connections for improved traffic between ICAO regions could be established between the UK and the US in 2011 and the UK and Singapore in the beginning of 2012.

By end 2011, ANSPs worldwide have replaced 14 operational international AFTN connections by an AMHS link. The up-to-date worldwide implementation status of AMHS is recorded in the ICAO COM Charts which are available from the AMC (ATS Messaging Management Centre) operated by EUROCONTROL.

== AMHS usage around the world ==
Country / Authority	Online since	AFTN / AMHS Gateway	ATS Message User Agent	ATS Service Level	System Supplier
Abu Dhabi (civil aviation authority)	2009	Yes	Yes	Extended	FREQUENTIS COMSOFT
Abu Dhabi (new airport)	2009	Yes	Yes	Extended	THALES
Afghanistan (OTAN)	2010	Yes	Yes	Extended	THALES
Albania	2016	Yes	Yes	Extended	FREQUENTIS
Angola	2012	Yes	Yes	Extended	FREQUENTIS COMSOFT
Algeria	2004	Yes	Yes	Basic	THALES
Argentina (Civil Aviation)	2022	Yes	Yes 250	Extended	FREQUENTIS COMSOFT
Argentina (Military)	2012	Yes	Yes 75	Extended	SKYSOFT
Argentina (Military)	2022	Yes	Yes 20	Extended	FREQUENTIS COMSOFT
Armenia	2016	Yes	Yes	Extended	Monitor Soft
Aruba	2025	Yes	Yes	Extended	THALES
Australia	2007	Yes	Yes	Extended	FREQUENTIS COMSOFT
Austria	2025	Yes	Yes	Extended	THALES
Azerbaijan	2013	Yes	Yes	Extended	IDS AirNav
Bahamas	2012	Yes	Yes	Extended	IDS AirNav
Bahrain	2024	Yes	Yes	Extended	THALES
Bangladesh	2026	Yes	Yes	Extended	THALES
Belgium	2010	Yes	Yes	Extended	FREQUENTIS COMSOFT
Belize	2025	Yes	Yes	Extended	THALES
Benin	2015	Yes	Yes	Extended	Indra Avitech
Bolivia	2010	Yes	Yes	Extended	THALES
Bolivia (Backup)	2021	Yes	Yes	Extended	SKYSOFT
Bosnia-Herzegovina	2010	Yes	Yes	Extended	FREQUENTIS COMSOFT
Botswana	2013	Yes	Yes	Extended	IDS AirNav
Brazil	2009	Yes	Yes	Basic	Atech
Brunei	2015	Yes	Yes	Extended	THALES
Bulgaria	2012	Yes	Yes	Extended	FREQUENTIS COMSOFT
Bulgaria (military)	2011	Yes	Yes	Extended	THALES
Burkina Faso	2016	Yes	Yes	Extended	Indra Avitech
Cambodia	2013	Yes	Yes	Extended	Indra Avitech
Canada	2012	Yes	Yes	Extended	Indra Avitech
Cape Verde	2005	Yes	Yes	Extended	FREQUENTIS
Cayman Islands	2014	Yes	Yes	Basic	FREQUENTIS
Chad	2015	Yes	Yes	Extended	Indra Avitech
China/Hong Kong	2009	Yes	Yes	Extended	FREQUENTIS COMSOFT
China/Macao	2008	Yes	Yes	Basic	FREQUENTIS COMSOFT
Chile	2019	Yes	Yes	Extended	FREQUENTIS COMSOFT
Colombia	2009	Yes	Yes	Extended	FREQUENTIS COMSOFT
Congo	2016	Yes	Yes	Extended	Indra Avitech
Costa Rica	2025	Yes	Yes	Extended	THALES
Croatia	2013	Yes	Yes	Extended	FREQUENTIS COMSOFT
Curaçao	2012	Yes	Yes	Extended	IDS AirNav
Cyprus	2016	Yes	Yes	Extended	THALES
Czech Republic	2019	Yes	Yes	Extended	FREQUENTIS
Denmark	2016	Yes	Yes	Extended	FREQUENTIS
Dominican Republic	2009	Yes	Yes	Extended	IDS AirNav
Dubai	2012	Yes	Yes	Extended	Indra Avitech
Ecuador (Quito & Guayaquil)	2011	Yes	Yes	Extended	THALES
Equatorial Guinea	2014	Yes	Yes	Extended	Intelcan
Ecuador (Guayaquil - Backup system)	2007	Yes	Yes	Extended	RADIOCOM + SKYSOFT
El Salvador	2025	Yes	Yes	Extended	THALES
Egypt	2008	Yes	Yes	Extended	FREQUENTIS COMSOFT
Estonia	2015	Yes	Yes	Extended	FREQUENTIS
Eswatini	2024	Yes	Yes	Extended	Indra Avitech
Ethiopia	2023	Yes	Yes	Extended	Indra Avitech
Eurocontrol NMOC	2005	Yes	Yes	Extended	FREQUENTIS COMSOFT
Eurocontrol MUAC	2011	Yes	Yes	Extended	FREQUENTIS COMSOFT
Fiji	2010	Yes	Yes	Extended	FREQUENTIS COMSOFT
Finland	2019	Yes	Yes	Extended	FREQUENTIS
France	2010	Yes	Yes	Extended	FREQUENTIS COMSOFT
France - French Guiana	2017	Yes	Yes	Extended	FREQUENTIS COMSOFT
France - New Caledonia	2016	Yes	Yes	Extended	FREQUENTIS COMSOFT
Georgia	2012	Yes	Yes	Extended	FREQUENTIS COMSOFT
Germany (civil)	2005	Yes	Yes	Extended	FREQUENTIS COMSOFT
Germany (military)	1996	Yes	No	Extended	Indra Avitech
Ghana	2012	Yes	Yes	Extended	FREQUENTIS COMSOFT
Ghana	2020	Yes	Yes	Extended	Indra Avitech
Greece	2018	Yes	Yes	Extended	FREQUENTIS
Guatemala	2025	Yes	Yes	Extended	THALES
Guinea	2012	Yes	Yes	Extended	Intelcan
Guyana	2011	Yes	Yes	Extended	Intelcan
Haiti	2026	Yes	Yes	Extended	THALES
Honduras	2025	Yes	Yes	Extended	THALES
Hungary	2009	Yes	Yes	Extended	Indra Avitech
Iceland	2010	Yes	Yes	Extended	Tern Systems
India (civil)	2012	Yes	Yes	Extended	FREQUENTIS COMSOFT
India (military)	2024	Yes	Yes	Extended	THALES
Indonesia	2016	Yes	Yes	Extended	IDS AirNav
Iran	2011	Yes	Yes	Extended	partodadeh
Ireland	2016	Yes	Yes	Extended	FREQUENTIS
Italy	2015	Yes	Yes	Basic	VITROCISET(AMHS) + SITTI(USER AGENT)
Jamaica	2010	Yes	Yes	Extended	IDS AirNav
Jersey	2024	Yes	Yes	Extended	FREQUENTIS
Jordan	2008	Yes	Yes	Extended	Indra Avitech
Kenya	2026	Yes	Yes	Extended	Indra Avitech
Kuwait	2012	Yes	Yes	Extended	FREQUENTIS COMSOFT
Laos	2011	Yes	Yes	Extended	THALES
Latvia	2024	Yes	Yes	Extended	FREQUENTIS
Lebanon	2013	Yes	Yes	Extended	THALES
Liberia	2012	Yes	Yes	Extended	Intelcan
Lithuania	2010	Yes	Yes	Extended	FREQUENTIS COMSOFT
Luxemburg	2024	Yes	Yes	Extended	FREQUENTIS
Macedonia	2006	Yes	Yes	Extended	FREQUENTIS COMSOFT
Malawi	2026	Yes	Yes	Extended	Indra Avitech
Malaysia	2024	Yes	Yes	Extended	FREQUENTIS
Madagascar	2016	Yes	Yes	Extended	Indra Avitech
Maldives	2023	Yes	Yes	Extended	IDS AirNav
Mali	2016	Yes	Yes	Extended	Indra Avitech
Malta	2019	Yes	Yes	Extended	FREQUENTIS COMSOFT
Mauritania	2016	Yes	Yes	Extended	Indra Avitech
Mauritius	2021	Yes	Yes	Extended	FREQUENTIS
Mexico	2022	Yes	Yes	Extended	THALES
Moldova	2012	Yes	Yes	Extended	IDS AirNav
Mongolia	2012	Yes	Yes	Basic	FREQUENTIS COMSOFT
Montenegro	2010	Yes	Yes	Extended	FREQUENTIS COMSOFT
Morocco	2007	Yes	Yes	Extended	FREQUENTIS COMSOFT
Mozambique	2012	Yes	Yes	Extended	IDS AirNav
Myanmar	2024	Yes	Yes	Extended	THALES
Nepal	2012	Yes	Yes	Extended	FREQUENTIS COMSOFT
Netherlands	2009	Yes	Yes	Extended	FREQUENTIS COMSOFT
New Zealand	2012	Yes	Yes	Extended	FREQUENTIS COMSOFT
Nicaragua	2025	Yes	Yes	Extended	THALES
Niger	2016	Yes	Yes	Extended	Indra Avitech
Norway	2018	Yes	Yes	Extended	FREQUENTIS
Oman	2008	Yes	Yes	Extended	FREQUENTIS COMSOFT
Pakistan	2009	Yes	Yes	Extended	FREQUENTIS COMSOFT
Panama	2013	Yes	Yes	Extended	THALES
Panama (Contingency)	2018	Yes	Yes	Extended	Indra Avitech
Papua New Guinea	2013	Yes	Yes	Extended	FREQUENTIS COMSOFT
Paraguay	2008	Yes	50	Extended	RADIOCOM + SKYSOFT
Peru	2008	Yes	Yes	Extended	FREQUENTIS COMSOFT
Philippines	2006	Yes	Yes	Extended	FREQUENTIS COMSOFT
Poland (civil)	2014	Yes	Yes	Extended	FREQUENTIS COMSOFT
Poland (military)	2013	Yes	Yes	Extended	FREQUENTIS COMSOFT
Portugal- Air Force	2018	Yes	Yes	Extended	FREQUENTIS
Portugal- ANSP	2017	Yes	Yes	Extended	THALES
Qatar	2010	Yes	Yes	Extended	FREQUENTIS COMSOFT
Romania	2018	Yes	Yes	Extended	THALES
Russia	2014	Yes	Yes	Extended	Monitor Soft
Saudi Arabia	2026	Yes	Yes	Extended	THALES
Saudi Arabia (MIL)	2017	Yes	Yes	Extended	THALES
Serbia	2010	Yes	Yes	Extended	THALES
Sénégal	2016	Yes	Yes	Extended	Indra Avitech
Sierra Leone	2012	Yes	Yes	Extended	Intelcan
Singapore	2007	Yes	Yes	Extended	FREQUENTIS COMSOFT
SITA (AMHS/Type X Gateway)	2015	Yes	Yes	Extended	FREQUENTIS COMSOFT
Slovakia	2008	Yes	Yes	Extended	FREQUENTIS COMSOFT
Slovenia	2024	Yes	Yes	Extended	THALES
South Africa	2012	Yes	Yes	Extended	THALES
Spain	1999	Yes	Yes	Extended	Telefónica
Sri Lanka	2012	Yes	Yes	Extended	IDS AirNav
St. Maarten	2012	Yes	Yes	Extended	IDS AirNav
Sudan	2012	Yes	Yes	Basic	THALES
Suriname	2011	Yes	Yes	Extended	Intelcan
Sweden	2024	Yes	Yes	Extended	FREQUENTIS
Switzerland	2010	Yes	Yes	Extended	FREQUENTIS COMSOFT
Taiwan	2018	Yes	Yes	Extended	FREQUENTIS COMSOFT
Tanzania	2015	Yes	Yes	Basic	FREQUENTIS COMSOFT
Thailand	2009	Yes	Yes	Extended	IDS AirNav
Trinidad & Tobago	2012	Yes	Yes	Extended	FREQUENTIS COMSOFT
Togo	2015	Yes	Yes	Extended	Indra Avitech
Tunisia	2008	Yes	Yes	Extended	Indra Avitech
Turkey	2009	Yes	Yes	Extended	Indra Avitech
Turkmenistan	2018	Yes	Yes	Extended	THALES
UAE- Sharjah International Airport	2024	Yes	Yes	Extended	FREQUENTIS
Uganda	2018	Yes	Yes	Extended	IDS AirNav
Ukraine	2014	Yes	Yes	Extended	Indra Avitech
United Kingdom	2006	Yes	Yes	Extended	FREQUENTIS COMSOFT
United States	2013	Yes	Yes	Extended	FREQUENTIS COMSOFT
Uruguay	2022	Yes	Yes	Extended	FREQUENTIS
Venezuela	2017	Yes	Yes	Extended	FREQUENTIS COMSOFT
Vietnam	2026	Yes	Yes	Extended	THALES
Zambia	2013	Yes	Yes	Extended	IDS AirNav
Zimbabwe	2010	Yes	Yes	Extended	FREQUENTIS COMSOFT

== See also ==
- Aeronautical Fixed Service
- Aeronautical Fixed Telecommunication Network
