= AIRMET =

Moderate flight weather advisory

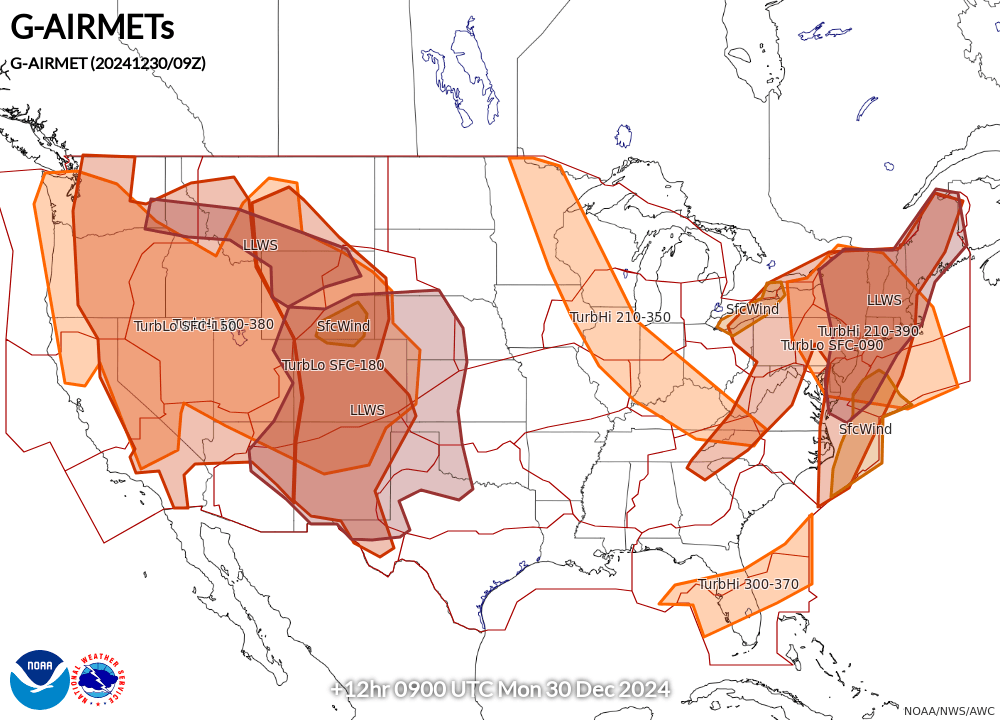
Graphical AIRMET showing turbulence high (TurbHi), turbulence low (TurbLo), surface wind (sfcWind), and low-level wind shear (LLWS) over the coterminous United States

An AIRMET, or Airmen's Meteorological Information, is a concise description of weather phenomena that are occurring or may occur (forecast) along an air route that may affect aircraft safety. Compared to SIGMETs, AIRMETs cover less severe weather: moderate turbulence and icing, sustained surface winds of 30 knots or more, or widespread restricted visibility. Today, according to the advancement of technology in civil aviation, the AIRMET is sent as IWXXM model.

== Types ==
AIRMETs are broadcast on the ATIS at ATC facilities, and are referred to as Weather Advisories. AIRMETs are valid for six hours. NOTE: The definition has changed and no longer says "light aircraft"; AIRMETs are intended for all aircraft.

There are three types of AIRMET, all identified by a phonetic letter: S (Sierra), T (Tango), and Z (Zulu).

- AIRMET SIERRA (Mountain obscuration or IFR) ceilings less than 1000 feet and/or visibility less than 3 miles affecting over 50% of the area at one time; extensive mountain obscuration
- AIRMET TANGO (Turbulence) moderate turbulence, sustained surface winds of 30 knots or greater, and/or non convective low−level wind shear.
- AIRMET ZULU (Icing) Moderate icing and provides freezing level heights.

For an authority to issue an AIRMET, applicable conditions must be widespread. "Widespread" means that the applicable area covers at least 3000 square miles. Because conditions across the forecast period can move across the area, it is possible that only a small portion of the area is affected at any time. AIRMETs are routinely issued for six-hour periods beginning at 0145Z during Daylight Saving Time and at 0245Z during Standard Time. AIRMETS are also amended as necessary due to changing weather conditions or issuance/cancellation of a SIGMET.

== Dissemination and structure ==
Most AIRMET dissemination is done in the XML-based Graphical AIRMET (G-AIRMET) format, but some computer systems use the legacy text-based Traditional Alphanumerical Code (TAC). This is identical in structure to a SIGMET, with the only difference being that the SIGMET identifier in the First Line is replaced by the three type identifiers listed above.

The TAC AIRMET is being retired, and only G-AIRMETs will be disseminated for the continental US starting on or about January 27, 2025.

== See also ==
- SIGMET
- PIREP
