= UAD =

UAD may stand for:

- United Action for Democracy, a Nigerian political group
- University of Abertay Dundee, a university in Dundee, Scotland
- Universitas Ahmad Dahlan, a university in Yogyakarta, Indonesia
- Democratic Arucasian Union (Spanish: Unión Aruquense Democrática), a small political party in Spain
- Art and Design University of Cluj-Napoca (Romanian: Universitatea de Artă şi Design), an art university in Romania
- UAD-1/UAD-2(Universal Audio Digital)_, a series of Digital signal processor cards
- Uniform Appraisal Dataset, a specification for appraisal data on loans
- Autonomous University of Durango (Spanish: Universidad Autónoma de Durango), a private university in Mexico with multiple campuses
