= PCDATA =

Data definition

Parsed Character Data (PCDATA) is a data definition that originated in Standard Generalized Markup Language (SGML), and is used also in Extensible Markup Language (XML) Document Type Definition (DTD) to designate mixed content XML elements.

== Example ==
The following sender-element could be part of an XML-document:

<sender>Anton Smith</sender>

The string "Anton Smith" would be considered as parsed character data.

When declaring document elements. An element declaration employing the #PCDATA content model value does not allow for child elements.

== See also ==
- CDATA
