= Pilot report =

Firsthand aeronautical condition report

The image at the top shows the approximate volume of air traffic captured in an instant in June 2016. The image below it shows graphical depictions of about two dozen PIREPs submitted during a one-hour period on the same day

A pilot report or PIREP is a report of actual flight or ground conditions encountered by an aircraft. Reports commonly include information about atmospheric conditions (like temperature, icing, turbulence) or airport conditions (like runway condition codes or ground equipment failures). This information is usually relayed by radio to the nearest ground station, but other options (e.g. electronic submission) also exist in some regions. The message would then be encoded and relayed to other weather offices and air traffic service units.

Although the actual form used to record the PIREP may differ from one country to another, the standards and criteria will remain almost the same. At a minimum the PIREP must contain a header, aircraft location, time, flight level, aircraft type and one other field.

In recent years, a PIREP will also include UA or UUA used to identify the PIREP as routine or urgent.

== Included data ==
=== Mandatory ===
- UA or UUA used to identify the PIREP as routine or urgent (In Canada this is indicated by the prefix to the PIREP: "UACN01" for an urgent PIREP or "UACN10" for a normal PIREP)
- /OV location of the PIREP, in relation to a NAVAID, an aerodrome or geographical coordinates
- /TM time the PIREP was received from the pilot (UTC)
- /FL flight level or altitude above sea level at the time the PIREP is filed; it is essential for turbulence and icing reports
- /TP aircraft type; it is essential for turbulence and icing reports

=== Optional (at least one is required) ===
- /SK sky cover
- /TA ambient temperature; important for icing reports
- /WV wind vector referenced in terms of true north (ICAO), or magnetic north (in the United States)
- /TB turbulence; intensity, whether it occurred in or near clouds, and duration
- /IC icing
- /RM remarks
- /WX flight visibility and weather

== AIREP ==
Like PIREPs, Aircraft Reports (AIREP) are reports of actual weather conditions of an aircraft in flight. AIREPs are often automated reports generated by sensors onboard the aircraft, contrary to PIREPs, though they can also be reported by pilots. Likewise, a different encoding is used for either type.

== Body ==
The message identifier "UA" is used when the PIREP contains non-hazardous weather information. If the PIREP contains a report of a tornado, funnel cloud, waterspout, severe turbulence, severe icing, hail, volcanic ash clouds, a low-level wind shear hazard, or any other weather deemed hazardous by the receiving agency, the identifier "UUA" would be used.

The location (/OV) can be reported in one of three ways: as a direction and distance from a navigation aid (NAVAID), as a direction and distance from an airport, or as the latitude and longitude of the aircraft.

The time (/TM) used is the UTC time that the PIREP is reported.

The flight level (/FL) is reported as either a three digit value that indicates the altitude of the aircraft above sea level in hundreds of feet or can be one of three abbreviations: DURD (during descent or on approach), DURC (during climb or after takeoff) and UNKN (unknown).

Aircraft type (/TP) will be the approved ICAO designator, or UNKN if not reported.

Sky cover (/SK) is used to report the cloud layer amounts and the height of the cloud base. The tops of the cloud layers can also be included, as can more than one layer of cloud delimited with /. Heights are in hundreds of feet above sea level and are three digits. Abbreviations used in this group are "CLR" (clear), "FEW" (few), "SCT" (scattered), "BKN" (broken) and "OVC" (overcast). Cloud cover ranges can be entered with a hyphen, e.g., BKN-OVC.

Flight visibility and weather (/WX) includes both flight visibility and the current flight weather phenomenon. Flight visibility is prepended with FV followed by two-digit visibility, rounded down. If visibility is reported as unrestricted, FV99SM may be used. Flight weather is reported in a similar format as in METAR.

Temperature (/TA) is the air temperature in whole degrees Celsius as a two-digit value, with negative temperatures preceded by a minus (-) sign. In the United States, negative temperatures are preceded by the letter M (M).

Wind velocity (/WV) must contain both the wind speed and direction. Direction is reported as a three-digit value in whole degrees true and the wind speed in knots also in three digits.

Turbulence (/TB) and the intensity are reported in a PIREP based on the aircraft and occupants reaction to the turbulence. The altitude of the turbulence should be included using three-digit groups. When the top or the base of the turbulence is unknown then the abbreviation BLO (below) or ABV (above) should be used. Turbulence should be reported as LGT (light), MDT (moderate), SVR (severe) or in exceptional cases EXTRM (extreme). Clear-air turbulence is reported as CAT.

Icing (/IC) is reported by type and the intensity or rate of accretion. The type of ice is reported as "CLR" (clear), "RIME", or "MXD" (mixed). The intensity is reported as "TR" (trace), "LGT" (light), "MDT" (moderate), and "SVR" (severe). (Units are measured in MSL - MEAN SEA LEVEL)

Remarks (/RM) report on other weather conditions that are not covered in the rest of the PIREP may include such things as icing in precipitation, thunderstorms, St. Elmo's fire and frontal conditions. There are many other types of weather conditions that could be reported in a PIREP. In the United States, the Federal Aviation Administration launched a program called SKYSPOTTER to train pilots in observing and reporting weather while in flight. Reports submitted by these pilots are annotated with /AWC at the end of the remarks section.

The explanations above is mostly north American. Other countries may use other groups and measurements.

=== Examples of PIREPs ===
These examples are taken from the Canadian MANOBS (Manual of Surface Weather Observations) published by Environment Canada.

- PIREP:

UACN10 CYQT 192128
YZ WG
UA /OV YSP 090025 /TM 2120 /FL050 /TP BE99 /SK 020BKN040 110OVC /TA -14 /WV 030045 /TB MDT CAT 060-080 /IC LGT RIME 020-040 /RM LGT FZRA INC

Decoded as:

Routine upper air report from Thunder Bay issued at 2128 UTC on the 19th of the month
YZ is Toronto and WG is Winnipeg: these are the Flight Information Regions where the PIREP was issued
Aircraft observation was 25 nmi (46 km) east (090 degrees radial) of the Marathon VOR/DME at 2120 UTC. The aircraft was at 5,000 ft (1,500 m) and is a Beech 99. The clouds were broken at 2,000 ft (610 m) AMSL with tops at 4,000 ft (1,200 m) and an overcast layer at 11,000 ft (3,400 m) AMSL. The temperature is −14 degrees Celsius and the winds are from the northeast (030 degrees true) at 45 kn (83 km/h). There is moderate clear air turbulence between 6,000 ft (1,800 m) and 8,000 ft (2,400 m). There is light rime icing between 2,000 ft (610 m) and 4,000 ft (1,200 m). Note this would indicate that the icing is picked up in the cloud. The remarks section says that light freezing rain was encountered in the cloud.

- PIREP

UACN10 CYXU 032133
YZ
UA /OV YUX 09010 /TM 2120 /FL030 /TP C172 /TB MDT /RM MDT TURB BLO 050 CYKF CYXU

Decoded as:

Routine message from London, issued at 2133 UTC on the 3rd of the month
The Flight Information Region is Toronto
The aircraft was 10 nmi (19 km) east (090 degrees radial) of the London VOR at 2120 UTC. The aircraft was at 3,000 ft (910 m) and was a Cessna 172. The pilot reported moderate turbulence. The remarks says that the turbulence was below 5,000 ft (1,500 m) between Kitchener/Waterloo and London.

== Soliciting PIREPs ==
In the US, air traffic controllers are required to solicit PIREPs upon request of other facilities or pilots, or when any of the following conditions exists or is forecast in their area.

- Ceilings at or below 5,000 feet (1,500 m)
- Visibility at or less than 5 miles (8.0 km)
- Thunderstorms and related phenomena
- Turbulence of moderate degree or greater
- Icing of light degree or greater
- Wind shear
- Volcanic ash clouds

At least once hourly, terminal controllers must obtain a descent/climb-out PIREP, including cloud information and other related phenomena.

== See also ==
- AMDAR – aircraft meteorological data relay, a WMO FM-42 code for an automatic meteorological report from an aircraft
- ACARS – ARINC Communications Addressing and Reporting System
- SIGMET
- AIRMET
- Aeronautical Information Manual
