= SIGMET =

Severe flight weather advisory

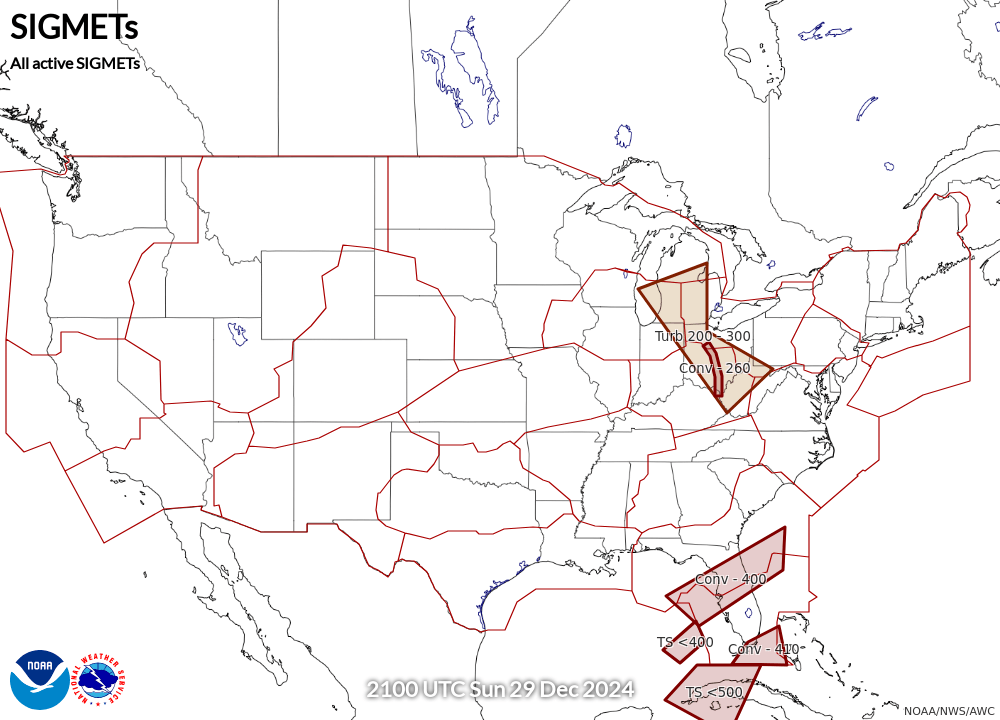
A map from the U.S. National Weather Service showing active SIGMETs

SIGMET, or Significant Meteorological Information (AIM 7-1-6), is a severe weather advisory that contains meteorological information concerning the safety of all aircraft. Compared to AIRMETs, SIGMETs cover more severe weather. Today, according to the advancement of technology in civil aviation, the SIGMET is sent as IWXXM model.

== Types ==
There are three main types of internationally recognized SIGMETs per ICAO:

- Volcanic ash (VA or WA SIGMET)
- Tropical Cyclone (TC or WC SIGMET)
- Other En-route weather phenomenon (WS SIGMET), which may consist of
  - Thunderstorm types
  - Turbulences types
  - Mountain waves
  - Icing/Sleet/Hail
  - Dust or sand storms
  - Radioactive Cloud

This information is usually broadcast on the ATIS at ATC facilities, as well as over VOLMET stations. They are assigned an alphabetic designator from N through Y (excluding S and T). SIGMETs are issued as needed, and are valid up to four hours. SIGMETS for hurricanes and volcanic ash outside the CONUS are valid up to six hours.

=== Convective SIGMETs ===
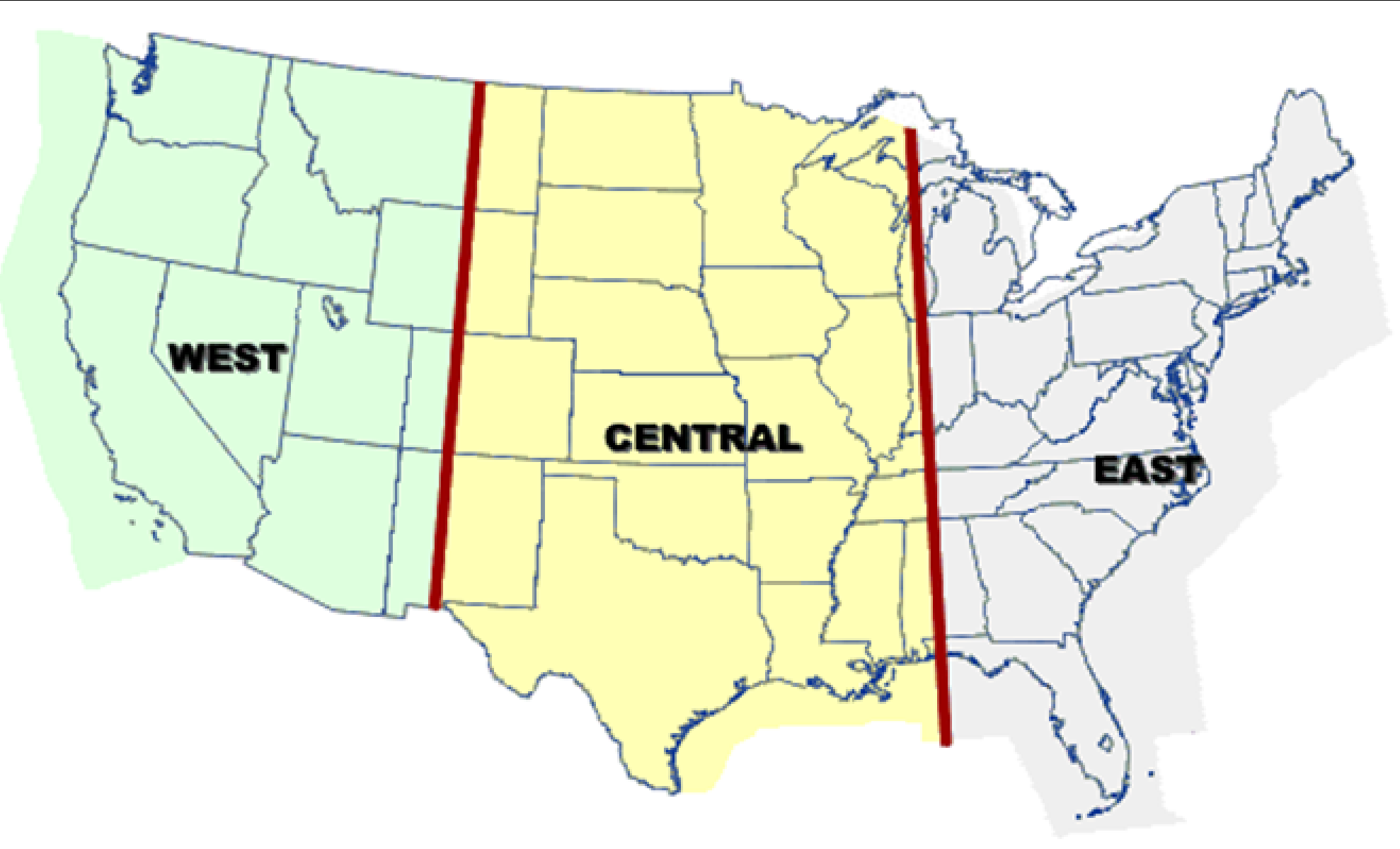
The eastern, central, and western regions of the coterminous United States have their own Convective SIGMET bulletin

For airmen in the U.S., there is an additional category of SIGMET known as a convective SIGMET. These are issued for convection over the coterminous U.S. on a scheduled basis, hourly at 55 minutes past the hour. The Convective SIGMETs are valid for 2 hours or until superseded by the next SIGMET. If it is determined that the conditions do not meet the Convective SIGMET criteria within a given region, a CONVECTIVE SIGMET... NONE is issued. Additionally, a 2 to 6-hour outlook is attached at the end of each regional bulletin.

There are three types of convective SIGMETs:

Type	Definition
Line Thunderstorm	Thunderstorms at least 60 miles long with thunderstorms affecting 40% of its length.
Area Thunderstorm	Thunderstorms covering at least 40% of the area concerned and exhibiting a very strong radar reflectivity or a significant satellite or lightning signature.
Embedded Thunderstorm	Embedded or severe thunderstorms expected to occur for more than 30 minutes.

When shown in a graphical depiction, the convective SIGMET polygon is a "snapshot" that delineates the region of thunderstorm at the issuance time of 55 past each hour.

There are also a few special issuance convective SIGMETs to cover extreme weather more common in the U.S., including:

- Tornadoes
- Hail greater than or equal to 3/4 inches in diameter
- Wind gusts greater than or equal to 50 knots
- Indications of rapidly changing conditions not sufficiently described in existing convective SIGMETs.

== Structure ==
SIGMETs are internationally used by ICAO and WMOs using standardized abbreviations

Abbreviation	Meaning
ABV	Above
CNL	Cancel or cancelled
CTA	Control area
FCST	Forecast
FIR	Flight Information Region
FL	Flight level
FT	Feet
INTSF	Intensify or intensifying
KT	Knots
KMH	Kilometres per hour
M	Metres
MOV	Moving
NC	No Change (in intensity)
NM	Nautical Miles
OBS	Observed
SFC	Surface
STNR	Stationary
TOP	Top (of CB cloud)
WI	Within (area)
WKN	Weakening (intensity)
Z	Coordinated Universal Time

and are split into three lines:

- Header
- Summary
- Main Body

In sum, a standardized SIGMET will have the following structure:

TTAAii CCCC YYGGgg [BBB] CCCC SIGMET [n][n]n VALID YYGGgg/YYGGgg CCCC- CCCC <FIR/CTA Name> FIR <Phenomenon> OBS/FCST [AT GGggZ] <Location> <Level> [MOV XXX xx KT/KMH] [INTSF/WKN/NC] <Forecast time and forecast position>=

=== Header ===
The header line consists of the following characters

TTAAii CCCC YYGGgg [CCx]

Component	Description
TT	A data type identifier per the types of SIGMETs mentioned above. VA or WV for volcanic ash, TC for tropical cyclone, and WS otherwise.
AA	The two-character country or territory code of the alert.
ii	Bulletin number
CCCC	The 4-character ICAO location of the dissmenating office.
YY	Day of the month.
GG	Hours UTC.
gg	Minutes UTC.
[CCx]	When included, indicates a correction that takes the form of CCx where x is A-Z indicating the correction number.

=== Summary ===
The first line of the broadcast is a summary line consisting of the following characters

CCCC SIGMET [n][n]n VALID YYGGgg/YYGGgg CCCC-

Component	Description
CCCC	The 4-character ICAO location of the affected area.
SIGMET	Indicates that this is a SIGMET broadcast. ^{[a]}
[n][n]n	A sequence number of the form 1', 01, A01, etc. which is incremented for each time the SIGMET remains effective past 0001UTC or upon renewals. Helps indicate how long the SIGMET has been active.
VALID YYGGgg/YYGGgg	Indicates the period the SIGMET is active (WS SIGMETs can not be active for more than 4 hours), where YY is the day of the month, GG is the hour, and gg is the minute.
CCCC-	The 4-character ICAO location of the dissmenating office followed by a hyphen.

Notes
[a] – if it a convective SIGMET, then this will read SIG[E/C/W] CONVECTIVE SIGMET ##[E/C/W]. Where E/C/W indicates whether it's over the Eastern, Central, or Western United States, and ## indicates the number of the convective SIGMET issued for that region.

=== Body ===
The main body of a SIGMET can be much more variable, and consists of

CCCC [FIR/CTA list] <Phenomenon> OBS/FCST [AT GGggZ] <Location> <Level> [MOV XXX xx KT/KMH] [INTSF/WKN/NC] [FCST AT <GGgg>Z <location>]=

CCCC [FIR/CTA list] is again the 4-character ICAO location, followed by the affected flight or control regions.

<Phenomenon> is a code describing the meteorological phenomena as follows:

Code	Description
OBSC TS	Obscured thunderstorms
EMBD TS	Embedded thunderstorms
FRQ TS	Frequent thunderstorms
SQL TS	Squall line thunderstorms
OBSC TSGR	Obscured thunderstorms with hail
EMBD TSGR	Embedded thunderstorms with hail
FRQ TSGR	Frequent thunderstorms with hail
SQL TSGR	Squall line thunderstorms with hail
SEV TURB	Severe turbulence
SEV ICE	Severe icing
SEV ICE (FZRA)	Severe icing due to freezing rain
SEV MTW	Severe mountain wave
HVY DS	Heavy duststorm
HVY SS	Heavy sandstorm
RDOACT CLD	Radioactive cloud

If it is a convective SIGMET, the following codes may appear

Code	Description
AREA TS	Area-wide thunderstorms
LINE TS	Thunderstorm line
EMBD TS	Embedded thunderstorms
TDO	Tornado
FC	Funnel Cloud
WTSPT	Waterspout
HVY GR	Heavy Hail

OBS/FCST [AT GGggZ] indicates whether the phenomenon is observed (OBS) or forecasted (FCST), and the Zulu hour and minute that it was observed or will be forecasted.

<Location> is a general description of location of the meteorological phenomenon, typically utilizing latitude and longitudinal coordinates.

<Level> helps denote the altitude that the phenomenon will be occurred, and can be expressed as

FLnnn or nnnnM or nnnnFT	At a particular altitude
SFC/FLnnn or SFC/nnnnM or SFC/nnnnFT	From the surface (SFC) to a particular altitude
FLnnn/nnn or nnnn/nnnnFT	Between certain altitudes
TOP FLnnn or ABV FLnnn or TOP ABV FLnnn	Above a certain point or cloud cover

[MOV XXX xx KT/KMH] if it is a moving front, the direction and rate of movement given as a compass direction (XXX, e.g. "N" or "WNW"), and the rate is given in KT (or KMH). Sometimes STNR (Stationary) may be used instead if no significant movement is expected.

[INTSF/WKN/NC] denotes the change in strength over time.

[FCST AT <GGgg>Z <location>] helps note where the front is expected to be at the end of the SIGMET's validity period.

=== SIGMET Renewal and Cancellation ===
If when the validity period is due to expire but the phenomenon is expected to persist, a new sequence number is added to the SIGMET to renew it.

If during the validity period of a SIGMET, the SIGMET is to be cancelled, the following replaces the SIGMET message

CNL SIGMET [n][n]n YYGGgg/YYGGgg

In the United States, non-convective SIGMETs have a valid period no more than 4 hours. If the phenomena continue, a new SIGMET will be reissued at least every 4 hours. If an amendment is needed, a new SIGMET will be issued using the next series number. Corrections to SIGMETs are issued as necessary, and are identified with COR.

== Examples ==
WSUS32 KKCI 071655

An en-route weather phenomenon in the U.S., issued by the Aviation Weather Center in Kansas City, MO on the 7th of August, at 16:55 UTC

SIGC
CONVECTIVE SIGMET 83C

This is a convective weather pattern in the central region of the contiguous U.S. with sequence number 83C

VALID UNTIL 1855Z

That is valid until 18:55 UTC

MI IN WI IL IA LM

That covers Minnesota, Indiana, Wisconsin, Illinois, Iowa, and Lower Michigan flight regions

FROM 30E GRR-30S GIJ-30SSW BDF-10ENE IOW-50ENE DBQ-30E GRR

A description of the area of the storm, where GRR (Grand Rapids, MI airport), GIJ (Niles, MI VORTAC), BDF (Bradford, IL VORTAC), IOW (Iowa City, IA airport), and DBQ (Dubuque, IA airport) are ConTrol Areas (CTAs).

AREA TS MOV FROM 25025KT. TOPS TO FL450.

Thunderstorms moving from 250 degrees (roughly WSW) at 25 knots, covering an altitude from the cloud cover to 45,000 ft.

== See also ==
- AIRMET
- PIREP
- IWXXM
- VOLMET
