= Aeronautical fixed service =

Telecommunication service used in aviation

Flag of the ICAO

The aeronautical fixed service (AFS) is a telecommunication service between specified fixed points provided primarily for the safety of air navigation and for the regular, efficient and economical operation of air services. ("Air service" means any scheduled air service performed by aircraft for the public transport of passengers, mail or cargo.) The AFS is provided by voice and data networks, including AFTN, AMHS and CIDIN.

However, any aeronautical radiocommunication between specified fixed points belongs – in accordance with article 1.20 of the International Telecommunication Union's (ITU) Radio Regulations (RR) – to the Fixed service.

== See also ==
- Aeronautical Fixed Telecommunication Network (AFTN)
- Air Traffic Services (ATS) Message Handling System (AMHS)
- Common ICAO Data Interchange Network (CIDIN)
- Radiocommunication service
