= LIXI =

LIXI Ltd
- Type: Non-profit organization
- Founded: 2001 as LIXI Ltd
- Headquarters: Sydney, Australia
- Key people: Shane Rigby (CEO) and Stephen Moore (Chair)
- Website: www.lixi.org.au

LIXI is an Australian, member-based not-for-profit company that develops data message transaction standards for the Australian mortgage processing industry, and promotes improvements in efficiency in mortgage processing. Owned by the members of the initiative, LIXI represents participants in the residential mortgage lending industry. Founded in 2001, LIXI has developed and released standards for such transactions as mortgage applications, property valuations, broker commissions and several others.

With the purpose being the exchange of transaction data in the lending chain, the initial LIXI efforts focused on the creation and promulgation of data standards based on XML. This effort had the intended result, with the organisation winning an Innovation Award from MIS magazine in 2005. LIXI also collaborates with the Australian research institution NICTA. This effort is in two primary areas, one is the creation of reference implementations of the data standards and the second is in the area of mapping data standards on to business processes.

== Members ==
Members of LIXI include all the major and mid-tier banks in Australia, as well as the mortgage insurers, valuation panel managers and large valuations firms, the major software providers to the lending industry, and a number of legal, conveyancing and outsource service providers:

== Bibliography ==
- Wang, Qing; Pfahl, Dietmar; Raffo, David (29 April 2008), "Making Globally Distributed Software Development a Success Story: International Conference on Software Process, ICSP 2008 Leipzig, Germany, May 10-11...", books.google.co.uk, ISBN 9783540795872
