= VOLMET =

Shortwave radio stations transmitting weather data

Shannon Volmet received on 5505 kHz at 2000 UTC on 31 March 2013 in the UK.

Russian VOLMET station on 6617 kHz

RAF Volmet on 5450 kHz at 5 May 2021

Canada's Gander Volmet received on 6604 kHz on 11 May 2021

VOLMET (French origin vol (flight) and météo (weather report)), or meteorological information for aircraft in flight, is a worldwide network of radio stations that broadcast TAF, SIGMET and METAR reports on shortwave frequencies, and in some countries on VHF too. Reports are sent in upper sideband mode, using automated voice transmissions.

Pilots on international routes, such as North Atlantic Tracks, use these transmissions to avoid storms and turbulence, and to determine which procedures to use for descent, approach, and landing.

The VOLMET network divides the world into specific regions, and individual VOLMET stations in each region broadcast weather reports for specific groups of air terminals in their region at specific times, coordinating their transmission schedules so as not to interfere with one another. Schedules are determined in intervals of five minutes, with one VOLMET station in each region broadcasting reports for a fixed list of cities in each interval. These schedules repeat every hour.

An aircraft in flight can obtain by VOLMET the Aviation routine weather reports (METAR) of specific airports.

== See also ==
- Automatic terminal information service (ATIS)
