= Landmark National Bank v. Kesler =

Landmark National Bank v. Kesler is a Kansas Supreme Court case involving the standing, rights, and interests of Mortgage Electronic Registration Systems (MERS). On August 28, 2009, the court held that all indispensable parties must be identified and that the actual lender identified in foreclosure actions to protect each party's rights. The decision also addressed the role MERS plays in clouding the ownership of the promissory note and title to the property.

== Background ==
In 2004, Boyd Kesler bought a home in Ford County, Kansas with a mortgage from Landmark National Bank and that lien was recorded on the deed with the county. Subsequently, Kesler secured a secondary mortgage for the same property from Millenia Corporation and that loan was later sold to Sovereign Bank. That second lien (and its sale to Sovereign) was recorded on the private MERS system but was never recorded with the county. Kesler later filed bankruptcy and listed the property with only the Sovereign lien. Upon receiving notice of the bankruptcy, Landmark served notice but to Kesler and Millenia but not Sovereign or MERS so the actual secondary lender was never notified. The foreclosure proceeded without Landmark, the primary mortgage lender.

Landmark, the appellant, then sued and sought to invoke due process rights which it said were violated when MERS failed to get notice of the fact that their "interest" was being wiped out via a prior foreclosure it did not receive notice of. The Court said simply that MERS — or any nominee" didn't have any interest and proves its point by reference to simple statements in the documents and the simplest of laws and interpretation of the role of MERS and the requirements of recordation. The splitting or bifurcation of the promissory note or mortgage note and mortgage or deed of trust creates an immediate and fatal flaw in title.

== Decision ==
The Kansas Supreme Court went on to cite several other case across the nation and stated: "When the role of a servicing agent [MERS] acting on behalf of a mortgagee is thrown into the mix, it is no wonder that it is often difficult for unsophisticated borrowers to be certain of the identity of their lenders and mortgagees." In re Schwartz, 366 B.R. 265, 266 (Bankr. D. Mass. 2007) and then cited the Supreme Court of New York (Kings County) that said: "[T]he practices of the various MERS members, including both [the original lender] and [the mortgage purchaser], in obscuring from the public the actual ownership of a mortgage, thereby creating the opportunity for substantial abuses and prejudice to mortgagors . . . , should not be permitted to insulate [the mortgage purchaser] from the consequences of its actions in accepting a mortgage from [the original lender] that was already the subject of litigation in which [the original lender] erroneously represented that it had authority to act as mortgagee." Johnson, 2008 WL 4182397, at *4, 873 N.Y.S.2d 234 (2008).
