= EMortgage =

Electronic Mortgaging

An eMortgage is an electronic mortgage where the loan documentation is created, executed, transferred and stored electronically.

In the United States eMortgages are made legally enforceable by the Electronic Signatures in Global and National Commerce Act and the Uniform Electronic Transactions Act. Standardization of eMortgages is being facilitated in the United States by the Mortgage Industry Standards Maintenance Organization (MISMO) eMortgage workgroup, which builds on the existing MISMO data standards, adding data elements and electronic signature capabilities to create an infrastructure for fully electronic mortgages. The eMortgage infrastructure is built around the concept of a SMART Document and the SMART DOC implementation guide.

== History ==
On June 30, 2000, the U.S. Congress passed the Electronic Signatures in Global and National Commerce Act, which together with the state laws like the Uniform Electronic Transactions Act enable the origination of enforceable electronic mortgages.

On June 28, 2002, Fannie Mae announced its readiness to purchase eMortgages in the role of investor in the secondary mortgage market.
