= XML Base =

Facility for defining base URIs in XML documents

XML Base is a World Wide Web Consortium recommended facility for defining base URIs, for resolving relative URIs, in parts of XML documents.

XML Base recommendation was adopted on June 27, 2001.
