= Common ICAO Data Interchange Network =

The Common ICAO Data Interchange Network (CIDIN) is a network, run by the International Civil Aviation Organization (ICAO), which makes up part of the aeronautical fixed service. It is used to transmit text or binary messages for the purposes of air traffic control.
