= Mortgage Bankers Association =

Real estate association in the US

- Abbreviation: MBA
- Formation: 1913; 113 years ago
- Type: Trade association
- Legal status: 501(c)(6) nonprofit organization
- Purpose: Advocacy, education, and professional standards for the real estate finance industry
- Headquarters: Washington, D.C., U.S.
- Region served: United States
- Members: Approximately 2,200 member companies
- Official language: English
- President and CEO: Robert Broeksmit
- Chair: Mark Jones
- Subsidiaries: MISMO (Mortgage Industry Standards Maintenance Organization)
- Website: www.mba.org

The Mortgage Bankers Association (MBA) is the national association representing all facets of the real estate finance industry in the United States and is headquartered in Washington, D.C. MBA represents over 2,200 member companies. MBA's membership base includes all sectors of the real estate finance industry including originators, servicers, unresidential, commercial, and multi-family arenas.

During the subprime mortgage crisis of 2008, the MBA's membership fell from 3,000 to 2,500. Its current membership is 2,200. Uniform multi-state licensing of mortgage originators began in 2008 with the Nationwide Multi-State Licensing System and Registry (NMLS). The NMLS requirements may have been greater than those of mortgage originator requirements of some states, and this may help explain part of the drop in membership.

MBA is headed by Robert Broeksmit, president and chief executive officer. Rodrigo Lopez, executive chairman of NorthMarq Capital, was MBA's chairman for 2017.

Mark Jones, president of Union Home Mortgage is MBA's chairman for 2024.

== Lobbying ==
The Mortgage Bankers Association has a political action committee called Mortgage Bankers Association Political Action Committee (MORPAC). MORPAC raises money to help elect and re-elect candidates to Congress who have an understanding of the real estate finance and housing industries, and who are supportive of the mortgage profession. The lobbying group is headed by Bill Killmer, Senior Vice President of Legislative and Political Affairs.

== Education ==
The MBA offers training and continuing education to mortgage professionals. It is also active in educating consumers.

=== MBA Education ===
MBA Education is the MBA's education division. MBA Education offers programs in various formats, including distance learning, live online workshops, classroom-based courses, corporate training and several books and other resources.

MBA Education offers industry certifications and designations, including the following:

- Certified Mortgage Banker (CMB)
- Accredited Mortgage Professional (AMP)
- Certified Loan Officer (CLO)
- Certified Mortgage Servicer (CMS)
- Certified Residential Underwriter (CRU)

=== School of Mortgage Banking ===
Since 1948, the MBA has been offering courses through The School of Mortgage Banking (SOMB) to the real estate finance community. SOMB is a series of three four-day courses, now administered by CampusMBA, the educational division of MBA created in 2000. The courses offer comprehensive instruction in specific aspects of the mortgage banking industry. Graduates of SOMB receive the Accredited Mortgage Professional (AMP) designation upon successful completion of the courses.

=== Home Loan Learning Center ===
The Home Loan Learning Center is a consumer education website providing financial literacy information on credit reports and scores, the true cost of owning a home and how to compare the costs of owning versus renting a home. The site includes information on how to qualify for a loan, what the documents mean, what's included in the mortgage payment. It also has mortgage calculators to help consumers plan their payments.

== MISMO ==
The Mortgage Industry Standards Maintenance Organization (MISMO), a nonprofit subsidiary of the MBA, is the leading technology standards development body for residential and commercial industry. MISMO promotes data consistency throughout the broader industry, reduces processing costs, increases transparency, and boosts investor confidence in mortgages as an asset class, while passing cost savings on to the consumer.

== Default on headquarters loan ==
In October 2009, the MBA sold its headquarters in Washington, D.C., for $41.3 million to CoStar Group. It had originally purchased the building in 2007 for $79 million, $75 million of which was financed from a group of banks headed by PNC Financial Services. It now rents offices nearby.

The association was criticized for defaulting on its mortgage despite saying that there's a moral obligation for homeowners to repay their mortgages.

The default was featured on The Daily Show on October 7, 2010, contrasting the MBA's actions with statements made by its representatives claiming that strategic default is morally wrong. MBA operatives refused to make a comment.
