= MISMO =

Mortgage standards body in the United States

The Mortgage Industry Standards Maintenance Organization (MISMO) is a not-for-profit, wholly owned subsidiary of the Mortgage Bankers Association (MBA) responsible for developing standards for exchanging information and conducting business in the U.S. mortgage finance industry. It has more than 175 member organizations representing a cross-section of the residential and commercial mortgage industries.

MISMO standards are accepted and deployed by almost every entity involved in creating or regulating mortgages in the United States, including banks, credit unions, mortgage lenders, Fannie Mae, Freddie Mac, Ginnie Mae, the Federal Housing Administration and the Consumer Financial Protection Bureau, in addition to settlement services providers, real estate appraisers and other third parties.

Use of MISMO standards has been found to lower per-loan costs, improve profit margins, reduce errors and speed up the loan process by reducing manual, paper-based processes and creating cost savings for consumers.

== Background ==
=== Mission ===
MISMO states its mission is “to drive standardized data and information and improved business practices between all mortgage stakeholders through collaborative and innovative initiatives that improve efficiency, reduce costs and facilitate stakeholder success.” The organization says it is committed to fostering an open process to develop, promote and maintain industry standards.

=== Membership ===
Membership in MISMO is open to any organization involved in the mortgage industry, including mortgage lenders, banks, credit unions, mortgage servicers, third-party vendors and individuals. Membership includes an End-User License and/or a Distributor License for use of MISMO standards, access to MISMO standards, and access to MISMO Connect, the organization's members-only online collaboration tool.

In 2017, MISMO changed from a tiered membership structure to single type of membership and rate for all corporate members but kept its existing individual contributor membership.

=== Leadership ===
MISMO is led by a board of directors that oversees MISMO's administration and policy developments. The board is advised by residential and commercial standards governance committees as well as strategic planning, education, and membership and revenue committees. Committee members are elected from a cross section of MISMO members.

== Standards Development ==
MISMO standards are established through a voluntary, collaborative process. Subject matter experts from all sectors of the mortgage finance industry are invited to participate in the process, but only MISMO members may vote on proposed standards.

Standards are created through individual workgroups and "communities of practice." As of August 2018, MISMO has a total of 21 workgroups and communities of practice. Topics range from blockchain technology, eNote validation rules, eMortgages, closing instructions and others. MISMO members can request the creation of a new workgroup or community of practice, which need to be approved by MISMO's governing board.

In addition to standards and specifications, MISMO develops implementation guides and toolkits to help other organizations adopt standards and to solve their various business issues. MISMO has also published a Business Glossary, an online resource of common mortgage industry business terms and data point descriptions that are used with MISMO standards.

== Other Activities ==
=== Education ===
MISMO provides courses and webinars to help lenders adopt technology and prepare for future technology advancements impacting the mortgage industry. Topics include eMortgages, "MISMO Fundamentals" and the Home Mortgage Disclosure Act (HMDA).

=== Certifications ===
MISMO offers several certification programs for organizations and professionals.

The Certified MISMO Standards Professional (CMSP) is a point-based certification program for professionals who demonstrate advanced knowledge of MISMO standards and best practices.

The MISMO Software Compliance Certification is designed for technology companies that can demonstrate their products comply with MISMO standards. There are two certification levels, "Standard" and "Premier." MISMO also offers a TILA RESPA Integrated Disclosures (TRID) Certification program for companies that use MISMO standards and best practices appropriately on mortgage loan disclosures that lenders must give borrowers.

== Affiliations and Related Bodies ==
MISMO has affiliations with The Appraisal Institute, The Property Records Industry Association, the American Land Title Association, CRE Finance Council and a number of other entities to build standards for both residential and commercial property transactions.

=== Parent ===
MISMO is a wholly owned subsidiary of the Mortgage Bankers Association.

== See also ==
- LIXI - Australian counterpart
- Grid-ML XML Schema Viewer - A tool for viewing and searching MISMO Schemas
