= IWXXM =

ICAO Meteorological Information Exchange Model (IWXXM) is a format for reporting weather information in XML/GML. IWXXM includes XML/GML-based representations for products standardized in International Civil Aviation Organization (ICAO) Annex III, such as METAR/SPECI, TAF, SIGMET, AIRMET, Tropical Cyclone Advisory (TCA), Volcanic Ash Advisory (VAA), Space Weather Advisory and World Area Forecast System (WAFS) Significant Weather (SIGWX) Forecast. IWXXM products are used for operational exchanges of meteorological information for use in aviation.

ICAO Annex 3 defines what IWXXM capability is required at different time frames. These capabilities can also be considered in the context of the ICAO SWIM-concept (Doc 10039, Manual on System Wide Information Management (SWIM) Concept).

Unlike the traditional forms of the ICAO Annex III products, IWXXM is not intended to be directly used by aircraft pilots. IWXXM is designed to be consumed by software acting on behalf of pilots, such as display software.

== History ==
IWXXM Version 1 was introduced in October 2013, representing METAR, SPECI, TAF and SIGMET formats as specified in International Civil Aviation Organization (ICAO) Annex III, Amendment 76. IWXXM became an optional format for the bilateral exchange of weather reports in November 2013 when the amendment became applicable. The seventeenth WMO Congress approved IWXXM 1.1, a WMO standard data representation to be included in the new Volume I.3 of WMO-No. 306, Manual on Codes.

IWXXM Version 2 was issued in August 2016 with the introduction of new products including AIRMET, Tropical Cyclone Advisory and Volcanic Ash Advisory, loads of improvements and bug fixes. Supported by the sixteenth session of the WMO Commission for Basic System in 2016, a slightly revised version IWXXM 2.1 has been approved by the sixty-ninth WMO Executive Council in May 2017. A patch (IWXXM Version 2.1.1) had been released and approved in Nov 2017 to fix minor issues on validation and examples.

IWXXM Version 3 was first made available as version 3.0RC1 in July 2018. Major changes include restructuring and simplifying with the removal of Observations and Measurements model (O&M), addition of the new Space Weather Advisory and other changes with regard to Amendment 78 to ICAO Annex 3, and numerous fixes and enhancements. IWXXM 3.0RC2 was released in October 2018 for further comments. Another release candidate IWXXM 3.0RC3 was released in April 2019. Approval was received in October 2019 and IWXXM 3.0RC4 was released before publishing of the finalized version on 7 November 2019.

IWXXM Version 2021-2 was published in Nov 2021 meeting new requirements in Amendments 79 and 80 to ICAO Annex 3, including the introduction of the new WAFS SIGWX Forecast to be provided by World Area Forecast Centers (WAFCs) by 2023. A bug fix version (IWXXM Version 2023-1) was published on 15 June 2023 to fix a few bugs involved in the schematron rules as well as introducing the missing icing phenomenon required in WAFS SIGWX Forecast.

A new version of IWXXM is being developed in response to the proposed changes in the upcoming Amendment 81 to ICAO Annex 3.

== Regulation ==
IWXXM is regulated by WMO in association with ICAO. IWXXM is defined at the technical regulation level in WMO No.306 Volume I.3 to meet the regulatory requirements described in ICAO Annex III. Another document ICAO Doc 10003 is also available to provide a high level description of the model.

== Development ==
The WMO Commission for Observation, Infrastructures and Information Systems (INFCOM) Task Team on Aviation Data or TT-AvData (previously Commission for Basic System (CBS) Task Team on Aviation XML or TT-AvXML) and ICAO Meteorological Panel (METP) Working Group on Meteorological Information Exchange (WG-MIE) are involved in the development of IWXXM. The e-mail group was created to collect feedback from users.

A GitHub repository has been created to engage community participation.

== Relationship with WXXM ==
WXXM is governed by FAA and EUROCONTROL for international products outside of those represented by ICAO or WMO. WXXM 1.0 was released in 2007. There were no new releases since the publication of WXXM 3.0.0 in 2019.

== See also ==
- METAR/SPECI
- TAF
- SIGMET
- AIRMET
- Tropical Cyclone Advisory
- Volcanic Ash Advisory
- Space Weather Advisory
- WAFS Significant Weather Forecast
