= Libxslt =

Library developed for the GNOME project

libxslt
- Release: September 23, 1999; 26 years ago
- Stable release: 1.1.45 / 30 November 2025; 9 months ago
- Written in: C
- Operating system: Unix-like, Windows, CygWin, Mac OS, AmigaOS, RISC OS, OS/2, VMS, QNX, MVS...
- Type: XSLT
- License: MIT License
- Website: xmlsoft.org
- Repository: gitlab.gnome.org/GNOME/libxslt

libxslt is the XSLT C library developed for the GNOME project. It provides an implementation of XSLT 1.0, plus most of the EXSLT set of processor-portable extensions functions and some of Saxon's evaluate and expressions extensions. libxslt is based on libxml2, which it uses for XML parsing, tree manipulation and XPath support. It is free software released under the MIT License and can be reused in commercial applications.

libxslt can be used either as library embedded into an application, or via the xsltproc command line tool. The integration into applications is eased by a multitude of language bindings and wrappers. Being written in C, libxslt is a fast and low-resource processor. This makes it a popular choice for DocBook formatting and as standard XSLT processor for programming languages like PHP, Perl or Python.

The WebKit layout engine (used e.g. in the Apple Safari web browser) uses the libxslt library to do XSL transformations.

The project was marked as unmaintained in July 2025 following the stepping down of Nick Wellnhofer. In August 2025, Iván Chavero became the sole maintainer of the project.

== See also ==
- libxml2
- Saxon XSLT (competitor)
- Xalan (competitor)
