= Inventive Designers =

Telecommunications software development company

- Company type: Private company
- Industry: Software
- Founded: 1994
- Headquarters: Antwerp, Flanders, Belgium
- Number of employees: 38 (November 2014)
- Website: https://www.inventivedesigners.com

Inventive Designers is an Antwerp, Belgium based software development company, which belongs to the Unifiedpost group. The company was founded in 1994 by Guy Dehond and Patrick Morren. Guy Dehond was one of the beta testers of the IBM AS/400 (codenamed "Silverlake") at IBM. Dehond and Morren had worked with this system for years, and their first products were for the AS/400 and its OS/400 operating system. Later they started to design products for cross-platform environments. Today, the company specializes in software for customer communications management in the public, financial, telecommunications, utility, insurance and healthcare industry, in over 30 countries.

In 2010, the company received a CIOnet Innovation Award.

The company participates in the AFP Consortium and the World Wide Web Consortium (W3C). At the W3C, Inventive Designers was active in the XSL Working Group, and Chief Technical Officer Klaas Bals was the editor of XSL Requirements 2.0 document. Currently, the company plays an active role in W3C's Forms Working Group.

At the end of 2012 Guy Dehond handed over the company to his daughter Joke Dehond and his son-in-law Klaas Bals.

In May 2017, Jim Verbist was named CEO of the company. In December 2018, the company was acquired by Unifiedpost.

== Company timeline ==
1994	Inventive Designers BVBA founded by Guy Dehond and Patrick Morren in Belgium
1996	Alteration of Inventive Designers BVBA into Inventive Designers NV (comparable to limited liability company)
1998	Introduction of EverGreen/400 to allow 5250 non-programmable workstations to act as a full e-mail capable terminal
1998	Worldwide distribution of EverGreen/400 by IBM
1999	Introduction of DTM for AS/400, capable of converting OfficeVision documents to XML
1999	Inventive Designers' Litrik De Roy is co-author of the IBM Redbook: How to Replace OfficeVision/400 in Your Applications
2000	Move to new offices
2002	Worldwide distribution of DTM for iSeries by Lotus Software
2002	Introduction of Scriptura XBOS, one of the first what-you-see-is-what-you-get XSL editors
2004	Release of Scriptura Designer and Scriptura Engine, first steps towards a document composition tool
2004	IBM's Watson Research Group invites Inventive Designers to join the XSL Working Group of the World Wide Web Consortium (W3C)
2005	Release of Scriptura XSL Business Output Suite, a platform to compose templates and generate multi-channel output. Introducing electronic forms.
2006	The company joins the AFP Consortium
2006	Director Joke Dehond receives XPlor's Electronic Document Professional certification
2007	Release of the Scriptura Post-Processor, enabling grouping, bundling, sorting ...
2009	Release of IntelliStamp (patent pending), a hybrid signature to secure electronic and paper documents
2009	Inventive Designers is selected for the Benelux short list of Logica's 'Global Innovation Venture Program' contest
2009	Release of Scriptura Document Flow, a what-you-see-if-what-you-get interface to design and execute document flows. Replaces the Scriptura Post-Processor
2009	Partnership with Xerox for Belgium and Luxemburg
2010	Scriptura's newest version gets a new name: Scriptura Engage
2011	IntelliStamp project at IAK wins DCM award
2012	Mechelen and Antwerp first cities worldwide to use IntelliStamp
2012	IntelliStamp Antwerp laureate ‘Accenture Innovation Award 2012’
2012	In December Joke Dehond and Klaas Bals took over the company as co-CEOs
2013	The IntelliStamp Center now offers IntelliStamp as a cloud service
2014	In April Scriptura Engage is named in Printing and Imaging by Gartner
2014	Scriptura Engage launches its own product website
2015	DataNews named Joke Dehond as ICT Woman of the Year 2015
2015	Inventive Designers sells IntelliStamp to Cipal, to focus on the internationalization of Scriptura Engage
2017	Jim Verbist takes over as CEO
2018	Acquisition of Inventive Designers by UnifiedPost
