= Leslie Ronald Kay =

British University administrator (1920–2019)

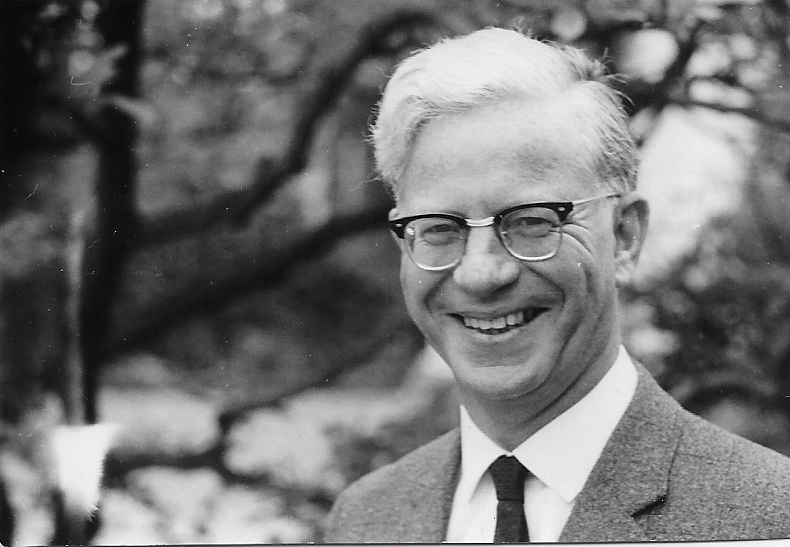
- Born: 4 March 1920; Sheffield, England
- Died: 17 May 2019 (aged 99); Cheltenham, England
- Education: Sheffield University
- Employer(s): British Council, Leeds University, Universities Central Council on Admissions
- Spouse: Alma Brigitte Kay (née Albert) (married 1949-2019)
- Children: Barbara Ingrid; Michael Howard; Robert Malcolm; Richard Ian; Eleanor Anne; Jennifer Mary
- Parents: Ernest Kay (father); May Kay (née Friskney) (mother)

Ronald Kay OBE (4 March 1920 – 17 May 2019) was a British University administrator who was instrumental in establishing the Universities Central Council on Admissions, and who was its chief executive until his retirement in 1985.

== Early life and career ==
Ronald Kay was born in Sheffield. His father Ernest (1895-1973) was a cutler who had left school at 13 to work for the firm of George Wostenholm, where he slowly rose through the ranks to achieve the position of sales manager. His mother May (née Friskney) (1898-1946) was originally from Leicester; she taught piano. Ronald was the elder of two children; his sister Shirley (1928-1986) was nearly nine years younger.

Ronald gained a scholarship to King Edward VII Grammar School, and subsequently an Edgar Allen scholarship to Sheffield University, where he read English.

Graduating in 1941, he was disqualified from active service as a result of poor eyesight, and instead went to London to work for the Ministry of Shipping where his duties included planning of Atlantic convoys. He shared an office at this time with the composer Gerald Finzi. One of his tasks was to arrange an exchange of prisoners of war on board the neutral Swedish passenger liner, the SS Drottningholm, in October 1943. Eight hundred German prisoners of war were assembled in Leith, Scotland, and sailed to Gothenburg in two British ships; meanwhile 4000 Allied prisoners were transported to Gothenburg and embarked on the Drottningholm and other ships, for return to Leith.

After the war, he enrolled with the Control Commission responsible for administering the British Zone of Allied-occupied Germany, and was posted to Hannover, where he was billeted in the family home of his future wife, Brigitte Albert. The house, in the suburb of Kleefeld, was one of the few left standing after the allied bombing raids.

Subsequently he joined the British Council and spent several years lecturing in English at the University of Copenhagen. He married Brigitte in Höver, a village in Sehnde, in 1949. They lived first in Copenhagen, where their first daughter was born, and then in Vienna. With the arrival of a second child they decided to settle in England in 1951, and soon afterwards, Ronald obtained a post as Assistant Registrar at the University of Leeds.

== Career in university administration ==
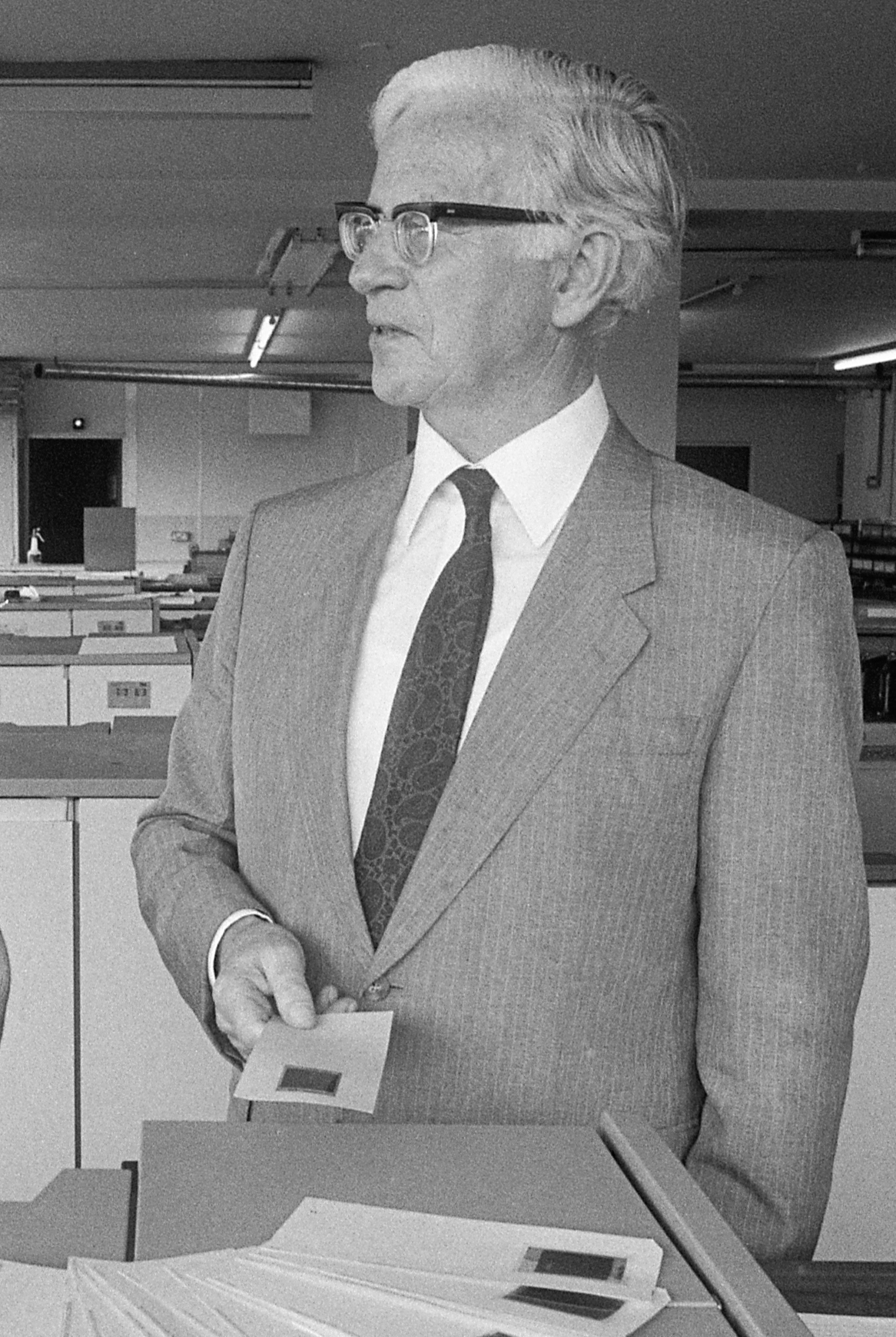
Ronald Kay is seen here holding an aperture card. Application forms were photographed onto 35mm microfilm slides, each mounted in an 80-column punched card. The holes in the card contained a summary of which universities and courses a candidate was applying to. Punched card sorters and collators were used to batch together applications for the same university and course, which were then fed into a Xerox Copyflo printer which printed the forms at high speed onto rolls of paper (at peak time in December, this used 5Km of paper daily). These were then despatched by post to the relevant institution.

Ronald Kay was responsible for admissions at Leeds University in the 1950s when he became aware that major reform was needed to handle the predicted growth in the university system. At that time Leeds was the largest University to have a centralised admissions process.

At the suggestion of Sandy Douglas, the University of Leeds' Pegasus computer was used for a project to process the University's matriculation records. This gave Ronald Kay insights into the potential for improving the admissions system through clerical automation.

As early as 1951, schools were campaigning for change: the fact that every university had different procedures, different forms, and different timetables made life very difficult for applicants and their advisors. Equally, individual universities, having made an offer to a candidate, had very little idea whether the student would actually show up in October, because there was nothing to stop applicants accepting multiple offers. At a national level, there was no accurate data on the number of successful and unsuccessful candidates, which made it difficult to plan the expansion of the sector expected in the 1960s.

An Ad-Hoc Committee to address the problem was set up by the Committee of Vice-Chancellors and Principals (CVCP) in 1958, and it published a series of reports in quick succession. The Third Report in January 1961 recommended setting up a central agency, which became UCCA. From June 1960 Ronald Kay was secretary of the Working Party responsible for this recommendation. From the beginning it was made clear that responsibility for deciding which candidates to accept or reject would remain firmly with the institutions; the role of the agency would be to control the number of applications made by each candidate, to maintain a record of the progress of those applications, and to impose a date by which candidates must choose between multiple offers. The final details of the scheme were agreed in principle by November 1961, and published in full in May 1962. During the academic year 1961-62 Kay was on full-time secondment from Leeds to set up the operation, holding discussions with computer manufacturers, and arranging premises and staffing for a pilot year of operation to handle the October 1963 entry. Staffing expanded from two (Ronald Kay and a typist) in February 1962, to 25 in September and 40 the following January. Premises at 29 Tavistock Square were rented from London University. During this time Kay was weekly-commuting from Leeds, leaving Brigitte and an au-pair to look after six children aged from 2 to 12. In the summer of 1962, once his permanent appointment was confirmed (the job title was still "Secretary"), the family relocated to Fleet, Hampshire.

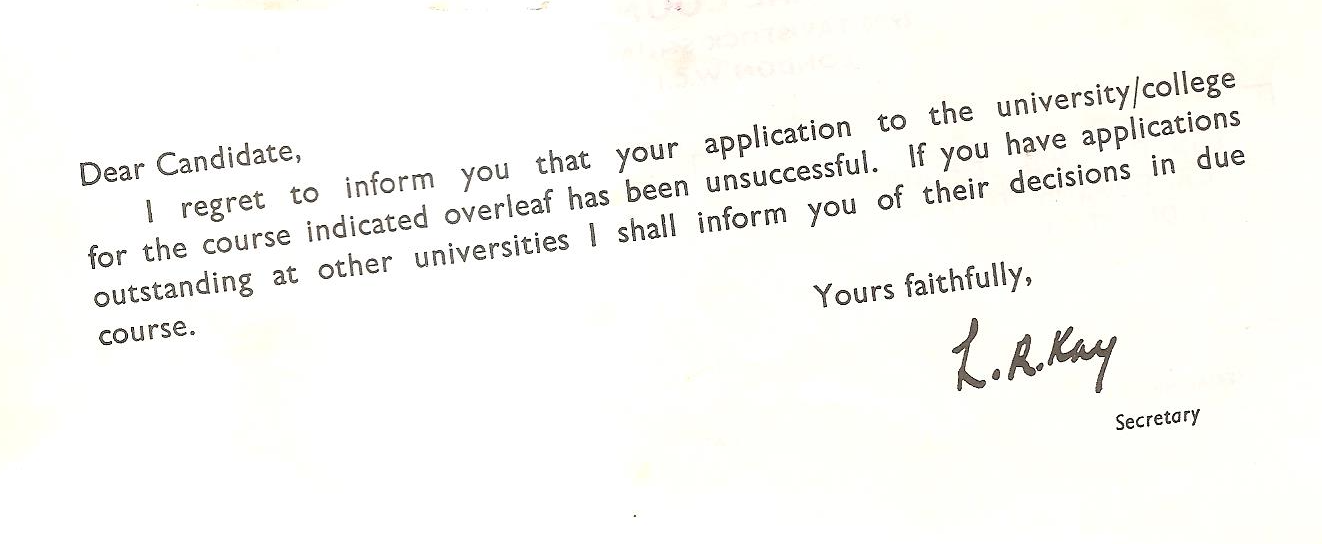
Every acceptance and rejection letter from UCCA carried Ronald Kay's signature

By 1968 the office had outgrown its London premises and transferred to Rodney Road in Cheltenham: he was keen to find somewhere that was attractive to live, with good schools to provide a potential workforce, with a postal sorting office capable of handling millions of letters a year, and preferably without its own University, to avoid any suggestion of bias.

Ronald Kay remained in charge of UCCA until his retirement in 1985.

UCCA expanded to become UCAS (adding the former Polytechnics to its remit) in 1992, after Ronald Kay retired, but he was responsible for much of the planning.

== Personal life ==
Ronald Kay's main interest outside work was music. He trained as an Anglican choir-boy, and through his 20s his career aspiration was to be a professional tenor soloist. Despite a number of professional engagements in the Sheffield area, he realised that he would not be able to earn his living this way, and thereafter devoted himself to amateur music-making. In 1944 he sang in the first performance of Michael Tippett's oratorio A Child of Our Time. When UCCA relocated to Cheltenham he joined the Cheltenham Bach Choir, and remained an active member of the tenor section well into retirement, serving at one time as vice-chairman. With the Bach Choir in 1995, he sang in the first performance of John Rutter's Birthday Madrigals. Even in his late 90s, he continued singing regularly with the Heart and Soul Community Choir in Tewkesbury.

After retiring from UCCA, he took a part-time post as music correspondent for the Gloucestershire Echo, writing regular reviews of concerts by both local amateurs and visiting professionals, including coverage of the Cheltenham Music Festival.

Ronald and Brigitte converted to Roman Catholicism in 1953.

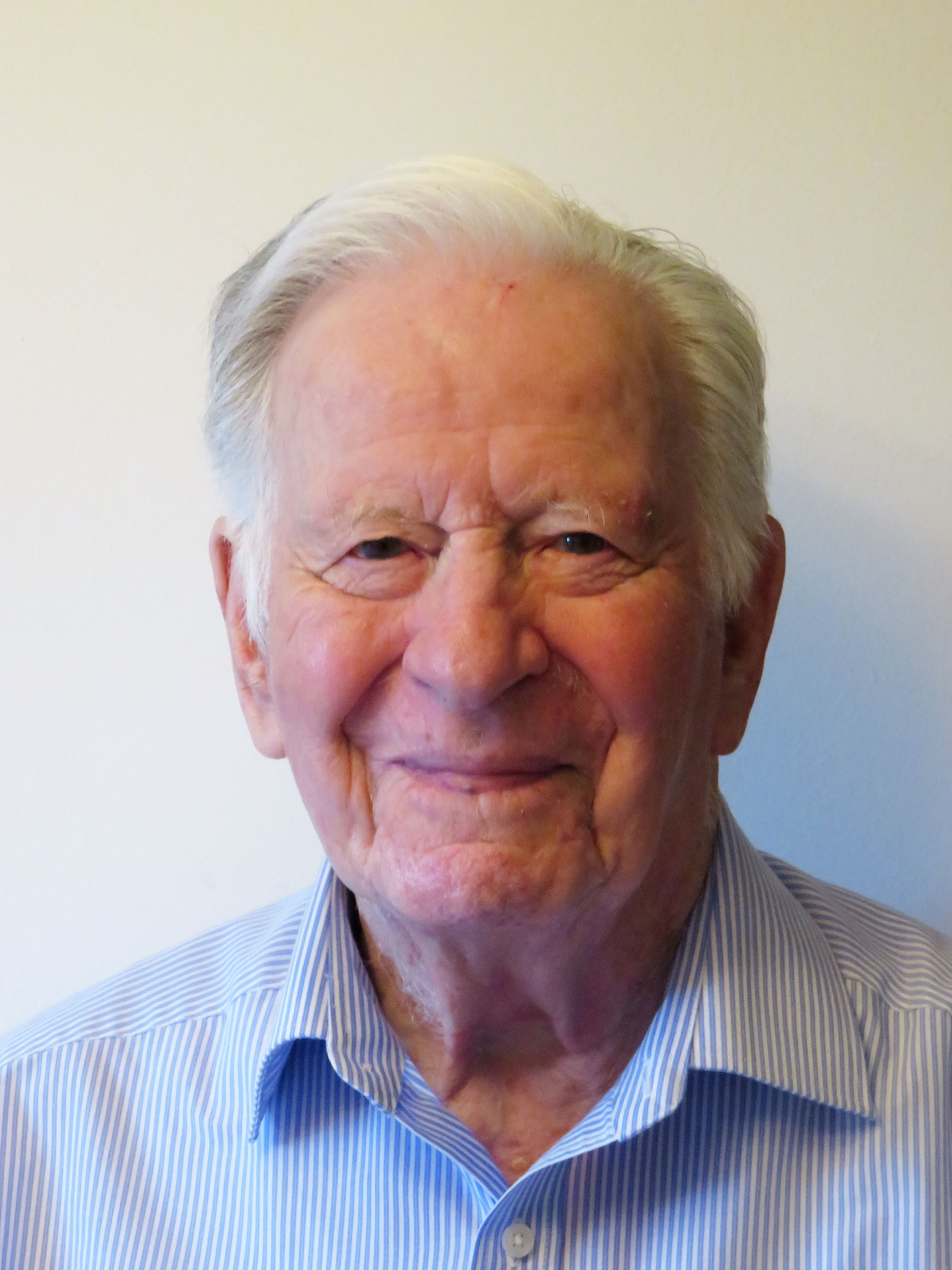
Ronald Kay in 2015

He was a governor and subsequently chairman of trustees of Charlton Park Convent School in Cheltenham, where his two youngest daughters had been pupils. This was at the time when the girls' convent school merged with the nearby boys' Catholic school, Whitefriars, to form the co-educational St Edward's School, Cheltenham; he therefore found himself managing the detailed negotiations surrounding the merger. The school sold some of its land for housing to finance this development; he bought one of the houses and lived there for the last 30 years of his life.

He was a keen cyclist but learned to drive and acquired his first car when already into his sixties, having previously argued that public transport and bicycles, together with liberal use of taxis, was cheaper and more convenient.

His marriage to Brigitte lasted 69 years. They lived at home until the end. Brigitte predeceased him by four months, dying in February 2019. They were survived by their six children (Barbara 1950, Michael 1951, Robert 1953, Richard 1955, Eleanor and Jenny 1959), with twelve grandchildren and seven great-grandchildren.

He died (of "frailty of old age", according to the death certificate) on 17 May 2019, at home with his family around him.

== Titles, honours, and awards ==
- Awarded OBE 1985.
