= Apache Xalan =

Software library

- Developer: Apache Software Foundation
- Stable release: 2.7.3 / April 2023; 3 years ago
- Written in: C++ or Java
- Type: Software library
- License: Apache License 2.0
- Website: xalan.apache.org

Xalan is a popular open source software library from the Apache Software Foundation, that implements the XSLT 1.0 XML transformation language and the XPath 1.0 language. The Xalan XSLT processor is available for both the Java and C++ programming languages. It combines technology from two main sources: an XSLT processor originally created by IBM under the name LotusXSL, and an XSLT compiler created by Sun Microsystems under the name XSLTC. A wrapper for the Eiffel language is available.

== See also ==
- Java XML
- Apache Xerces
- libxml2
- Saxon XSLT
