= XSLT elements =

Key elements of Extensible Stylesheet Language Transformations (XSLT)

XSLT (Extensible Stylesheet Language Transformations) defines many elements to describe the transformations that should be applied to a document. This article lists some of these elements. For an introduction to XSLT, see the main article.

== XSLT logic elements ==
Node	Description/ attributes	Container/ children	Example
xsl:apply-templates	Specifies that other matches may exist within that node; if this is not specified any matches will be ignored. If select is specified, only the templates that specify a “match” that fits the selected node or attribute type will be applied. I.e. the matching elements by select attribute in xsl:apply-templates correspond to the template that match the same elements. If mode is specified, only the templates that have the same “mode” and have an appropriate “match” will be applied.	Any parent. Can contain any number of xsl:sort and xsl:with-param children.	<xsl:apply-templates/>
xsl:choose	Multiple choices. No attributes.	Any parent. Contains xsl:when blocks and up to one xsl:otherwise block.	<xsl:choose> … </xsl:choose>
xsl:for-each	Creates a loop which repeats for every match. select designates the match criteria.	Any parent. Can contain any XML.	<xsl:for-each select="input[@name=$name]"> … </xsl:for-each>
xsl:if	Yes or out No conditions. test specifies criteria for entering the if.	Any parent. Can contain any XML.	<xsl:if test="$type='text' or $type='password'"> … </xsl:if>
xsl:otherwise	The default choice if none of the xsl:when criteria are met.	xsl:choose. Can contain any XML.	<xsl:otherwise> … </xsl:otherwise>
xsl:stylesheet	Top-level element. Occurs only once in a stylesheet document. version specifies which XSLT version is being used. xmlns:xsl specifies the URL of that standard.	Top-level element. Contains all XML.	<xsl:stylesheet> … </xsl:stylesheet>
xsl:template	Specifies processing templates. match is when the template should be used. name gives the template a name which xsl:call-template can use to call this template.	xsl:stylesheet. Can contain any XML.	<xsl:template match="//input"> … </xsl:template>
xsl:variable	Allows a variable to be declared. name is the variable name. It can be referred to later with $name. select is the value of the variable.	Any parent. no children.	<xsl:variable name="type" select="@type"/>
xsl:when	Yes or No conditions. test specifies criteria for entering the if.	xsl:choose. Can contain any XML.	<xsl:when test="$type='radio'"> … </xsl:when>

=== Example XSLT stylesheet using logic elements ===
<xsl:stylesheet>
    <xsl:template match="//input">
        <xsl:variable name="type" select="@type"/>
        <xsl:variable name="name" select="@name"/>
        <xsl:if test="$type='text' or $type='password' or $type='radio' or $type='checkbox'">
            <xsl:choose>

                <xsl:when test="$type='radio'">
                    <xsl:if test="not(preceding-sibling::input[@type='radio'])">
                        <select name="{@name}">
                            <xsl:for-each select="../input[@name=$name]">
                                <option value="{@value}">
                                    <xsl:apply-templates/>
                                </option>
                            </xsl:for-each>
                        </select>
                    </xsl:if>
                </xsl:when>

                <xsl:when test="$type='text'">
                    <input name="{@name}" type="{@type}">
                        <xsl:apply-templates/>
                    </input>
                </xsl:when>

                <xsl:when test="$type='password'">
                    <input name="{@name}" type="{@type}">
                        <xsl:apply-templates/>
                    </input>
                </xsl:when>

            </xsl:choose>
        </xsl:if>
    </xsl:template>
</xsl:stylesheet>

== XSLT file I/O elements ==
Node	Description/ attributes	Container/ children	Example
xsl:call-template	Calls the template whose name is specified. name matches the name in xsl:template.	Any parent. children are xsl:with-param.	<xsl:call-template name="lib:make-elem">
xsl:import	Retrieves another XSLT file. href is the URI of the file.	xsl:stylesheet. No children.	<xsl:import href="..\Library\FuncLib.xslt"/>
xsl:output	Describes how data will be returned. method designates what kind of data is returned. omit-xml-declaration indicates if the initial xml tag should be included. encoding designates how the data is returned.	xsl:stylesheet. No children.	<xsl:output method="xml" omit-xml-declaration="yes" encoding="UTF-8"/>
xsl:param	Designates a parameter which may be passed into the template with xsl:call-template.	xsl:template. No children.	<xsl:param name="elem-name"/>
xsl:text	Outputs the tag content.	Any parent. No children.	<xsl:text>ClaimNumber ClaimSeqNumber</xsl:text>
xsl:value-of	Outputs a variable. select specifies the variable.	Any parent. No children.	<xsl:value-of select="$s"/>
xsl:with-param	Designates a parameter passed to xsl:call-template. It must be matched by an xsl:param in the template. name specifies the parameter name. select specifies the parameter value.	xsl:call-template. No children.	<xsl:with-param name="elem-name" select="'hma:ClaimNumber'"/>

Client-side XSLT can be implemented in a browser by adding a line like the following to the source XML file, right after the root XML tag.

<?xml-stylesheet type="text/xsl" href="family.xsl"?>

This is described on the page http://www.xml.com/pub/a/2000/10/25/msie/index.html

== Other XSLT semantics ==
symbol	meaning	where used
|	union operator. used to group nodesets in XPath expressions.	select attributes of elements such as xsl:when, xsl:if, xsl:for-each.
&	and	any conditional or match criterion, for example xsl:if.test, xsl:when.test, xsl:template.select and xsl:for-each.select.
<!--	begin comment.	anywhere not in a tag.
-->	end comment.	anywhere not in a tag.
$	start of a variable name.	anywhere in a tag, for example xsl:value-of.select and xsl:variable.name.
name()	the name of the tag being processed. Useful if the matching criteria contains |s (pipe symbols).	any conditional or match criterion, for example xsl:if.test, xsl:when.test, xsl:template.select and xsl:for-each.select.
@	an attribute within the XML.	any conditional or match criterion, for example xsl:if.test, xsl:when.test, xsl:template.select and xsl:for-each.select.

== Functions defined by XSLT ==
The following functions can occur in many XSLT attributes, such as xsl:value-of.select and xsl:for-each.select.

Function	Description/ Syntax	Example
ceiling	The ceiling function returns the smallest integer that is equal to or is larger than the numeric value of the number argument.	ceiling(3.57)
concat	Concatenates two or more strings.	concat($fname, ' ', $lname)
contains	Returns true if the first string contains the second string, otherwise returns false.	contains('string to search', 'find')
count	The count function counts and returns the number of nodes in a node-set.	count(elements)
floor	The floor function returns the largest integer that is equal to or is smaller than the numeric value of the number argument.	floor(3.57)
normalize-space	Removes white-space from the beginning and end of the string	normalize-space($fname)
position	The position function returns the one-based index of the current node being processed by an xsl:for-each or xsl:apply-templates element node-list. There are no arguments.	position()
round	The round function rounds a number to its closest integer.	round(3.57)
string	The string function converts the value argument to a string.	string()
string-length	The string-length function returns the number of characters in a string. The string argument is optional. If omitted, the default is to use the string value of the context node.	string-length('hello')
substring	A segment within a variable value. Substring takes three parameters: the input variable, the first character to be selected, and the length of the resulting string	substring($dob,4,2)
substring-after	The substring-after function returns a portion out of the string specified in the string argument that occurs after the substring specified in the substring argument.	substring-after('In 1814 we took a little trip', 'we')
substring-before	The substring-before function returns a portion out of the string specified in the string argument that occurs before the substring specified in the substring argument.	substring-before('In 1814 we took a little trip', 'we')
sum	The sum function adds and returns the total value of a set of numeric values in a node-set or list of values.	sum(1,3,7,12)
translate	Takes the string in the value argument, replaces all occurrences of characters in the string1 argument with substitute characters at the same location in the string2 argument and returns the modified string.	translate('band', 'abcd', 'ABCD') = 'BAnD'
