= Michael Howard Kay =

German-born British computer programmer (born 1951)

Michael Kay
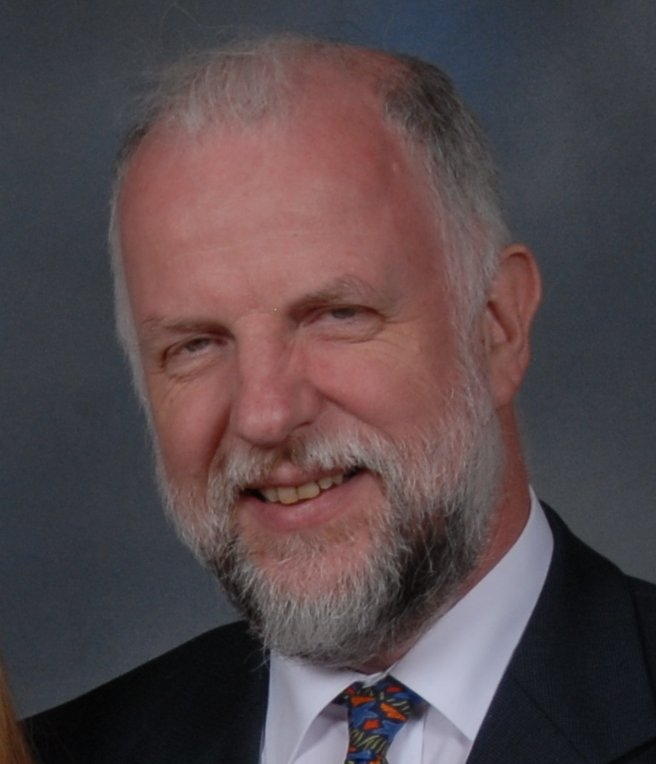
- Born: Michael Howard Kay; 11 October 1951 (age 74); Hannover, West Germany
- Education: Salesian College, Farnborough
- Alma mater: University of Cambridge (MA, PhD)
- Known for: Saxon XSLT
- Spouse: Penelope M. Kay
- Awards: ICL Fellow (1990)
- Scientific career
- Fields: Software
- Institutions: Saxonica Ltd.; Software AG; International Computers Limited
- Thesis: Data independence in database management systems (1976)
- Doctoral advisor: Maurice Wilkes
- Website: saxonica.com

Michael Howard Kay (born 11 October 1951) is the editor of the W3C XSLT 2.0 and 3.0 language specifications for performing XML transformations, and the developer of the Saxon XSLT and XQuery processing software.

== Education ==
Michael Kay is the son of Ronald Kay (1920-2019) and Alma Brigitte Kay (née Albert) (1924-2019). His father was English, his mother German; he was born in Germany but has always lived in England.

Kay was educated at Salesian College in Farnborough, and at the University of Cambridge where he read Natural Sciences as an undergraduate student at Trinity College, Cambridge. He gained his Doctor of Philosophy degree while working in the Computer Laboratory, University of Cambridge under the supervision of Maurice Wilkes on databases.

== Career ==
Kay spent over twenty years (1977-2001) with the British computer manufacturer International Computers Limited (ICL). He was appointed an ICL Fellow in 1990. On leaving ICL, he worked for three years with Software AG before forming his own company, Saxonica. He has previously been involved in GedML: Genealogical Data in XML.

== Publications ==
Kay is the author of the book XSLT: Programmer's Reference by Wrox Press and several other books and papers on software engineering. He lives and works in Reading, England and is a member of the XML Guild and a regular speaker at the XML Summer School in Oxford and Balisage Markup conference.

Kay discusses his views on the role of XML, XSLT, open standards, and open source software in a 2022 interview with Yegor Bugayenko.
