= Stephen Molyneux =

British educational technologist

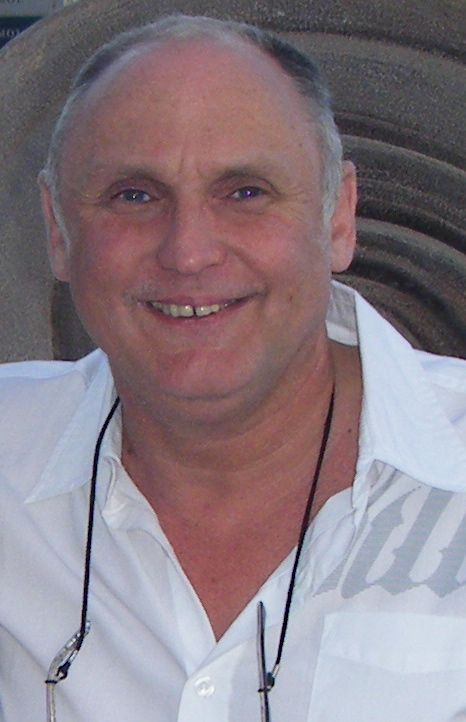
- Born: 24 February 1955 (age 71); Walton, Liverpool, England

Stephen Molyneux (born 24 February 1955) is a British educational technologist whose work as Microsoft Professor of Advanced Learning Technology and Apple Distinguished Educator has led to him influencing the use of technologies across the British School system.

After spending 16 years in the multimedia and education industry working for ATARI and the German Ministry of Education and Science, Molyneux returned to the UK in 1991 to take up the position of Professor of Multimedia at the University of Wolverhampton where he was responsible for the Interactive Multimedia Communications undergraduate programme. During this time Molyneux was responsible for project BroadNet, a network designed to deliver training materials online to Small Business across England's West Midlands region.

For this pioneering work, in 1994 he was appointed a Fellow of the British computer giant ICL alongside other distinguished ICL Fellows

In 1995, whilst holding the Microsoft Chair of Advanced Learning Technologies at the University of Wolverhampton, he developed one of the first Virtual Learning Environments in the UK.

In 1996, as a British Association for the Advancement of Science media fellow he developed with Ed Briffa, Editor of the BBC Science programme Tomorrow's World, a first real-time online science magazines to report live from the Annual Festival of Science held at University of Birmingham.

In 2002 he was appointed by Estelle Morris, the then Secretary of Education, as a member of the Post-16 eLearning Strategy Taskforce. The taskforce was chaired by Steve Morrison, CEO of ITV. The report was published in July 2002 under the title "Getting on with IT".

In 2003 he proposed and attracted funding for an "e-Innovation Centre" at Wolverhampton University which could combine the research and development skills of the higher education sector with that of industry to promote Internet-based start-up companies.

In 2005 he was appointed advisor to the UK Deputy Chief of Defence Staff to monitor the evaluation of the Ministry of Defence Defence Training Review initiative.

In 2012 he founded the Tablet Academy as an education consultancy, teacher training, and student engagement organisation focusing on the use of technology to transform education.

In 2014, he became an adjunct professor in educational innovation at Lamar University.

He was appointed a Justice of the Peace in 1994, but on 25 April 2009 he resigned as a Magistrate due to his refusal to stop reporting the outcome of public criminal hearings on Twitter.

As a former serving member of the Royal Air Force he is an active member of the Royal Air Force Association and works closely with the RAF STEM Ambassadors Education outreach programme at RAF Cosford and RAF Waddington.

He is a former patron of Shropshire Young Enterprise and from 2003-2007 was Mayor of Oakengates, in Telford where he lived until 2012 when he relocated to Fuerteventura in the Canary Islands.

Today he works as Chairman of Tablet Academy International remotely from his home in Fuerteventura and is engaged in a number of projects, including working with the Ministry of Education to transform education in Guyana.
