= XML pipeline =

Part of Extensible Markup Language

In software, an XML pipeline is formed when XML (Extensible Markup Language) processes, especially XML transformations and XML validations, are connected.

For instance, given two transformations T_{1} and T_{2}, the two can be connected so that an input XML document is transformed by T_{1} and then the output of T_{1} is fed as input document to T_{2}. Simple pipelines like the one described above are called linear; a single input document always goes through the same sequence of transformations to produce a single output document.

== Linear operations ==
Linear operations can be divided in at least two parts

=== Micro-operations ===
They operate at the inner document level

- Rename - renames elements or attributes without modifying the content
- Replace - replaces elements or attributes
- Insert - adds a new data element to the output stream at a specified point
- Delete - removes an element or attribute (also known as pruning the input tree)
- Wrap - wraps elements with additional elements
- Reorder - changes the order of elements

=== Document operations ===
They take the input document as a whole

- Identity transform - makes a verbatim copy of its input to the output
- Compare - it takes two documents and compare them
- Transform - execute a transform on the input file using a specified XSLT file. Version 1.0 or 2.0 should be specified.
- Split - take a single XML document and split it into distinct documents

=== Sequence operations ===
They are mainly introduced in XProc and help to handle the sequence of document as a whole

- Count - it takes a sequence of documents and counts them
- Identity transform - makes a verbatim copy of its input sequence of documents to the output
- split-sequence - takes a sequence of documents as input and routes them to different outputs depending on matching rules
- wrap-sequence - takes a sequence of documents as input and wraps them into one or more documents

== Non-linear ==
Non-linear operations on pipelines may include:

- Conditionals — where a given transformation is executed if a condition is met while another transformation is executed otherwise
- Loops — where a transformation is executed on each node of a node set selected from a document or a transformation is executed until a condition evaluates to false
- Tees — where a document is fed to multiple transformations potentially happening in parallel
- Aggregations — where multiple documents are aggregated into a single document
- Exception Handling — where failures in processing can result in an alternate pipeline being processed

Some standards also categorize transformation as macro (changes impacting an entire file) or micro (impacting only an element or attribute)

== XML pipeline languages ==
XML pipeline languages are used to define pipelines. A program written with an XML pipeline language is implemented by software known as an XML pipeline engine, which creates processes, connects them together and finally executes the pipeline. Existing XML pipeline languages include:

=== Standards ===
- XProc: An XML Pipeline Language is a W3C Recommendation for defining linear and non-linear XML pipelines.

=== Product-specific ===
- W3C XML Pipeline Definition Language is specified in a W3C Note.
- W3C XML Pipeline Language (XPL) Version 1.0 (Draft) is specified in a W3C Submission and a component of Orbeon Presentation Server OPS (now called Orbeon Forms). This specification provides an implementation of an earlier version of the language. XPL allows the declaration of complex pipelines with conditionals, loops, tees, aggregations, and sub-pipelines. XProc is roughly a superset of XPL.
- Cocoon sitemaps allow, among other functionality, the declaration of XML pipelines. Cocoon sitemaps are one of the earliest implementations of the concept of XML pipeline.
- smallx XML Pipelines are used by the smallx project.
- ServingXML defines a vocabulary for expressing flat-XML, XML-flat, flat-flat, and XML-XML transformations in pipelines.
- PolarLake Circuit Markup Language used by PolarLake's runtime to define XML pipelines. Circuits are collections of paths through which fragments of XML stream (usually as SAX or DOM events). Components are placed on paths to interact with the stream (and/or the outside world) in a low latency process.
- xmlsh is a scripting language based on the unix shells which natively supports xml and text pipelines

== Pipe granularity ==
Different XML Pipeline implementations support different granularity of flow.

- Document: Whole documents flow through the pipe as atomic units. A document can only be in one place at a time. Though usually multiple documents may be in the pipe at once.
- Event: Element/Text nodes events may flow through different paths. A document may be concurrently flowing through many components at the same time.

== Standardization ==
Until May 2010, there was no widely used standard for XML pipeline languages. However, with the introduction of the W3C XProc standard as a W3C Recommendation as of May 2010, widespread adoption can be expected.

== History ==
- 1972 Douglas McIlroy of Bell Laboratories adds the pipe operator to the UNIX command shell. This allows the output from one shell program to go directly into input of another shell program without going to disk. This allowed programs such as the UNIX awk and sed to be specialized yet work together . For more details see Pipeline (Unix).
- 1993 Sean McGrath developed a C++ toolkit for SGML processing.
- 1998 Stefano Mazzocchi releases the first version of Apache Cocoon, one of the first software programs to use XML pipelines.
- 1998 PolarLake build XML Operating System, which includes XML Pipelining.
- 2002 Notes submitted by Norman Walsh and Eve Maler from Sun Microsystems, as well as a W3C Submission submitted in 2005 by Erik Bruchez and Alessandro Vernet from Orbeon, were important steps toward spawning an actual standardization effort. While neither submission directly became a W3C recommendation, they were considered key sources of inspiration for the W3C XML Processing Working Group.
- September 2005 W3C XML Processing Working Group started. The task of this working group was to create a specification for an XML pipelining language.
- August 2008, xmlsh, an XML pipeline language was announced at Balisage 2008

== See also ==
- Apache Cocoon
- Identity transform
- NetKernel
- Pipeline (Unix)
- W3C recommendation
- XSLT
