= ICL Fellows =

- Description: Appointment recognizing the highest levels of pioneering achievement and technical excellence in computing at International Computers Limited
- Country: United Kingdom
- Presented by: International Computers Limited

The ICL Fellows scheme celebrated the highest levels of pioneering achievement in the field of computing at International Computers Limited, a British IT company.

ICL Fellows were appointed on the basis of their technical excellence and peer recognition in order to develop technical leadership across the company and to represent it externally. ICL Fellows also acted as technical advisers to senior company management.

== History of the ICL Fellowship ==
Robb Wilmot – the then managing director of ICL – appointed Professor Brian Warboys, the chief designer of ICL’s VME mainframe operating system and later Professor of Software Engineering at the University of Manchester as an "ICL Fellow" in 1984. The role was to share good engineering practice across the company.

The ICL Fellows scheme was formally initiated in 1990 by Sir Peter Bonfield who was Chairman and CEO of ICL plc at that time. Five more technical leaders with a range of expertise were appointed. At this point, Professor Brian Warboys became the Senior ICL Fellow. Further appointments were made throughout the 1990s.

In 1993, The ICL Fellows introduced the ICL Distinguished Engineer Scheme in order to build an engineering network across the company that would remain resilient to organisational change. They also introduced an annual engineering conference that ran until 2001.

Following ICL’s acquisition by and rebranding to Fujitsu in the early 2000s, support for the Fellowship scheme became limited. However, in 2013 the scheme was re-launched as the Fujitsu Fellowship, with the same ambition to recognise and celebrate outstanding achievement and technical excellence. Three prior ICL Fellows – Nig Greenaway, Nic Holt and Jeff Parker – were appointed inaugural Fujitsu Fellows. The revived programme also includes recognition & development of Distinguished Engineers, and the return of an annual engineering conference.

== Notable ICL Fellows ==
Notable fellows include Professor Brian Warboys (1984), Michael Kay (1990), Professor Steve Molyneux (1996) who was the first non-employee Fellow, and Ron Brunt (1999) who was the first ICL Fellow appointed in the United States.
