= Antenna House Formatter =

- Original author(s): Antenna House Co., Ltd
- Developer(s): Antenna House
- Initial release: 22 November 2000.
- Stable release: V7.2 MR2 / December 17, 2021; 3 years ago
- Written in: C++
- Operating system: Microsoft Windows, Mac OS X, Linux
- Type: converter
- License: Proprietary
- Website: www.antennahouse.com

Antenna House Formatter (AH Formatter) is a proprietary software program that uses either XSL-FO or Cascading Style Sheets (CSS) to convert XML and HTML documents into PDF, SVG, PostScript, XPS, text, and Microsoft Word formats. It supports 30 scripts and over 80 languages.

AH Formatter is developed by Antenna House Co., Ltd, based in Tokyo, Japan. International sales and support is provided by Antenna House, Inc., based in Newark, DE, USA.

== History ==
The first English-language release of "Antenna House XSL Formatter" was announced on the XSL-List mailing list on 22 November 2000.

Antenna House XSL Formatter V1.2 Alpha was one of six XSL Formatters that provided the test results for the test suite for the XSL 1.0 Candidate Recommendation that was required for XSL 1.0 to proceed to the Proposed Recommendation stage.

In December 2008, Antenna House Co., Ltd announced the availability of Antenna House Formatter V5.0 with support for both XSL-FO and CSS. The product supporting both XSL-FO and CSS was released as "AH Formatter", and single stylesheet language versions were released as "AH XSL Formatter" and "AH CSS Formatter".

== Uses ==
Antenna House Formatter is used, for example, to generate PDF from JATS, DITA or DocBook XML.

AH CSS Formatter is used in the "md2pdf" GitHub project for Markdown to PDF conversion.
