= Libxml2 =

Free software library

libxml2
- Original author: The GNOME Project
- Release: September 23, 1999; 27 years ago
- Stable release: 2.15.4 / 4 September 2026; 30 days ago
- Written in: C
- Operating system: cross-platform
- Type: XML parser, XML validator
- License: MIT License
- Website: xmlsoft.org
- Repository: gitlab.gnome.org/GNOME/libxml2

libxml2 is a software library for parsing XML documents. It is also the basis for the libxslt library which processes XSLT-1.0 stylesheets.

== Description ==
Written in the C programming language, libxml2 provides bindings to C++, Ch, XSH, C#, Python, Swift, Kylix/Delphi and other Pascals, Ruby, Perl, Common Lisp, and PHP. It was originally developed for the GNOME project, but can be used outside it. libxml2's code is highly portable since it only depends on standard ANSI C libraries and it is available under the MIT license since 2002, when it was previously made available under the GNU Lesser General Public License. It has become the de facto standard XML and HTML parsing library in the open-source world, being shipped in most of the Linux distributions.

It includes the command-line utility xmllint and an HTML parser.

As of June 2025, libxml2 was being maintained by a single person, Nick Wellnhofer.

While the maintainer is an unpaid volunteer, the library is used in commercial software. In June 2025, Wellnhofer declared that he will treat security problem reports as normal bugs, fixed when there is time. In taking this stance, Wellnhofer hoped to encourage commercial users of the library to contribute work or money for maintenance.

On 15 September 2025, Wellnhofer announced that he was stepping down as maintainer. He has since started a libxml fork re-licensed under the GNU Affero General Public License.

== See also ==
- libxslt (the LibXML2's XSLT module)
- XML validation
- Comparison of HTML parsers
- Expat (library)
- Saxon XSLT
- Xerces
- GNOME Project
