= EXSLT =

EXSLT is a community initiative to provide extensions to XSLT, which are broken down into a number of modules, listed below.

The creators (Jeni Tennison, Uche Ogbuji, Jim Fuller, Dave Pawson, et al.) of EXSLT aim to encourage the implementers of XSLT processors to use these extensions, in order to increase the portability of stylesheets.

== List of functions ==
=== Common EXSLT ===
Common covers common, basic extension elements and functions.

Function Name	Return Type	Parameter Types
exsl:node-set	node-set	object
exsl:object-type	string	object

=== Math EXSLT ===
Math covers extension elements and functions that provide facilities to do with mathematics.

Function Name	Return Type	Parameter Types
math:min	number	node-set
math:max	number	node-set
math:highest	nodeset	node-set
math:lowest	node-set	node-set
math:abs	number	number
math:acos	number	number
math:asin	number	number
math:atan	number	number
math:atan2	number	number, number
math:constant	number	string, number
math:cos	number	number
math:exp	number	number
math:log	number	number
math:power	number	number, number
math:random	number	(none)
math:sin	number	number
math:sqrt	number	number
math:tan	number	number

=== Sets EXSLT ===
Sets covers those extension elements and functions that provide facilities to do with set manipulation.

Function Name	Return Type	Parameter Types
set:difference	node-set	node-set, node-set
set:intersection	node-set	node-set, node-set
set:distinct	node-set	node-set
set:has-same-node	boolean	node-set, node-set
set:leading	node-set	node-set, node-set
set:trailing	node-set	node-set, node-set

=== Dates and Times EXSLT ===
Dates and Times covers date and time-related extension elements and functions.

Function Name	Return Type	Parameter Types
date:date-time	string	(none)
date:date	string	string?
date:time	string	string?
date:year	number	string?
date:leap-year	boolean	string?
date:month-in-year	number	string?
date:month-name	string	string?
date:month-abbreviation	string	string?
date:week-in-year	number	string?
date:day-in-year	number	string?
date:day-in-month	number	string?
date:day-of-week-in-month	number	string?
date:day-in-week	number	string?
date:day-name	string	string?
date:day-abbreviation	string	string?
date:hour-in-day	number	string?
date:minute-in-hour	number	string?
date:second-in-minute	number	string?
date:format-date	string	string, string
date:parse-date	string	string, string
date:week-in-month	number	string?
date:difference	string	string, string
date:add	string	string, string
date:add-duration	string	string, string
date:sum	string	node-set
date:seconds	number	string?
date:duration	string	number?

=== Strings EXSLT ===
Strings covers extension elements and functions that provide facilities to do with string manipulation.

Function Name	Return Type	Parameter Types
str:tokenize	node-set	string, string?
str:replace	node-set	string, object, object
str:padding	string	number, string?
str:align	string	string, string, string?
str:encode-uri	string	string, string, string?
str:decode-uri	string	string, string
str:concat	string	node-set
str:split	node-set	string, string?

=== Regular Expressions EXSLT ===
Regular Expressions covers extension elements and functions that provide facilities to do with regular expressions.

Function Name	Return Type	Parameter Types
regexp:test	boolean	string, string, string?
regexp:match	object	string, string, string?
regexp:replace	string	string, string, string, string

=== Dynamic EXSLT ===
Dynamic covers extension elements and functions that deal with the dynamic evaluation of strings containing XPath expressions.

Function Name	Return Type	Parameter Types
dyn:evaluate	object	string
dyn:min	number	node-set, string
dyn:max	number	node-set, string
dyn:sum	number	node-set, string
dyn:map	node-set	node-set, string
dyn:closure	node-set	node-set, string

=== Random EXSLT ===
Random covers extension elements and functions that provide facilities to do with randomness.

Function Name	Return Type	Parameter Types
random:random-sequence	number	number?, number?
