= XSL =

XML stylesheet language

In computing, the term Extensible Stylesheet Language (XSL) is used ambiguously to refer to the languages XSLT and XSL-FO which are used to transform and render XML documents (e.g., XSLT is used to determine how to display a XML document as a webpage).

1. XSL Transformation (XSLT): an XML language for transforming XML documents
2. XSL Formatting Objects (XSL-FO): an XML language for specifying the visual formatting of an XML document. It's an intermediary format which can be used when transforming from XML with XSLT to a print format like PDF. Using XSL-FO usually implies using XSLT too.

== History ==
XSL began as an attempt to bring the functionality of DSSSL, particularly in the area of print and high-end typesetting, to XML.

In response to a submission from Arbortext, Inso, and Microsoft, a W3C working group on XSL started operating in December 1997, with Sharon Adler and Steve Zilles as co-chairs, with James Clark acting as editor (and unofficially as chief designer), and Chris Lilley as the W3C staff contact. The group released a first public Working Draft on 18 August 1998. XSLT became W3C Recommendations on 16 November 1999. XSL-FO reached Recommendation status in October 2001 but the specification was just called XSL despite only actually describing XSL-FO. However it claims XSL to consist of two parts and calls XSLT the other.

Abstract

This specification defines the features and syntax for the Extensible Stylesheet Language (XSL), a language for expressing stylesheets. It consists of two parts:

1. a language for transforming XML documents (XSLT), and

2. an XML vocabulary for specifying formatting semantics.

An XSL stylesheet specifies the presentation of a class of XML documents by describing how an instance of the class is transformed into an XML document that uses the formatting vocabulary.

XSL-FO 1.1 came out in December 2006 and again the specification was called just XSL 1.1.

In January 2007 the XSLT 2.0 specifications released.. The XSL-FO 2.0 Working Draft never became a finalized standard.

== See also ==
- XSLT
- XSL Formatting Objects
- XPath
