= JCL =

JCL may refer to:

== Academics, science and technology ==
- Jatropha curcas (abbreviation of Jatropha curcas Linnaeus), a species of plant
- Job Control Language, a scripting language used on IBM mainframe operating systems
- Java Class Library
- Jakarta Commons Logging, a logging utility
- Licentiate of Canon Law (J.C.L.), a title in the Roman Catholic Church

== Locations ==
- České Budějovice Airport, České Budějovice, Czechia, IATA code
- John Crerar Library at the University of Chicago, in Chicago, Illinois, United States
- Johnson County Library, in Johnson County, Kansas, United States

== Publication ==
- University of Pennsylvania Journal of Constitutional Law
- The Journal of Commonwealth Literature
- The Journal of Corporation Law
- Journal of Chinese Linguistics
- Journal of Cosmetic & Laser Therapy

== Organizations ==
- National Junior Classical League, a youth organization of the American Classical League in the United States
- Juniperus Capital Limited, a hedge fund based in Bermuda
