= Adalı =

Adalı (Turkish for "islander" or "with islands") may refer to:

== Surname ==
- Kutlu Adalı (1935–1996), Turkish Cypriot journalist, poet, socio-political researcher and peace advocate
- Sibel Adalı (fl. 1991–present, Turkish-American computer scientist
- Tülay Adalı (fl. 1992–present, Turkish-American electrical engineer

== Places ==
- Adalı, Bigadiç, a village
- Adalı, Kahta, a village in Kahta district of Adıyaman Province, Turkey
- Adalı, Karataş, a village in Karataş district of Adana Province, Turkey
