= Fatma Özcan =

Turkish-American computer scientist

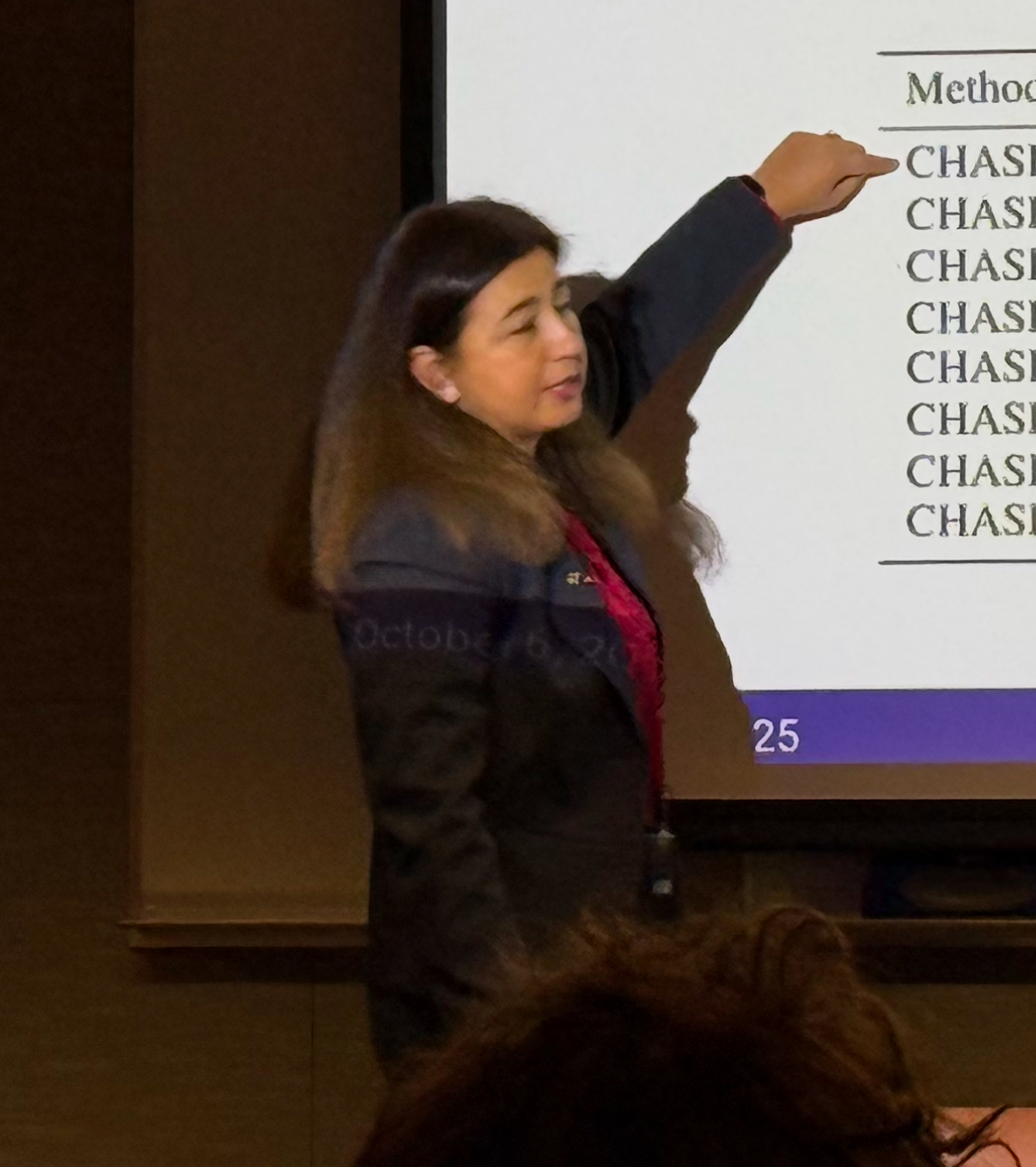
Özcan in 2025

Fatma Özcan is a Turkish-American computer scientist who works as a principal software engineer at Google, where her work concerns infrastructure such as MapReduce for the analysis of big data.

== Education and career ==
Özcan has an undergraduate degree from Middle East Technical University in Ankara. She completed her Ph.D. in 2001 at the University of Maryland, College Park, with the dissertation Improving the performance of heterogeneous databases and agents, supervised by V. S. Subrahmanian.

On completing her Ph.D., Özcan joined the IBM Research Almaden Research Center in San Jose, California, where her first project involved integrating XML with the IBM Db2 database, a feature that later became known as pureXML. She moved from IBM to Google in 2020.

== Recognition ==
Özcan received the 2022 VLDB Women in Database Research Award of the Very Large Data Bases Endowment, given "for two decades of research in query languages and query processing, and her development of new technologies that have had significant impact on widely-used data management products". She was named as an ACM Fellow, in the 2024 class of fellows, "for contributions to the field of scalable data management systems".
