= XQuery API for Java =

Application programming interface

XQJ
- Developer: Java Community Process
- Stable release: 1.0 / 24 June 2009
- Type: Data Access API
- Website: JSR 225: XQuery API for Java

General architecture of how an XQJ driver is used to communicate with an XML Database from Java Applications.

XQuery API for Java (XQJ) refers to the common Java API for the W3C XQuery 1.0 specification.

The XQJ API enables Java programmers to execute XQuery against an XML data source (e.g. an XML database) while reducing or eliminating vendor lock in.

The XQJ API provides Java developers with an interface to the XQuery Data Model. Its design is similar to the JDBC API which has a client/server feel and as such lends itself well to Server-based XML Databases and less well to client-side XQuery processors, although the "connection" part is a very minor part of the entire API. Users of the XQJ API can bind Java values to XQuery expressions, preventing code injection attacks. Also, multiple XQuery expressions can be executed as part of an atomic transaction.

== History and implementation ==
The XQuery API for Java was developed at the Java Community Process as JSR 225. It had some big technology backers such as Oracle, IBM, BEA Systems, Software AG, Intel, Nokia and DataDirect.

Version 1.0 of the XQuery API for Java Specification was released on June 24, 2009, along with JavaDocs, a reference implementation and a TCK (Technology Compatibility Kit) which implementing vendors must conform to.

The XQJ classes are contained in the Java package javax.xml.xquery

There is no (visible) activity to create a version of XQJ that provides support for XQuery 3.0 or 3.1, for example by providing Java bindings for additions to the data model such as functions, arrays, or maps.

== Functionality ==
XQJ allows multiple implementations to exist and be used by the same application.

XQJ connections support creating and executing XQuery expressions. Expressions may be updating and may include full text searches. XQJ represents XQuery expressions using one of the following classes:

- XQExpression – the expression is sent to the XQuery processor every time.
- XQPreparedExpression – the expression is cached and the execution path is pre-determined allowing it to be executed multiple times in an efficient manner.

XQuery expressions return a result sequence of XDM items which in XQJ are represented through the XQResultSequence interface. The programmer can use an XQResultSequence to walk over individual XDM items in the result sequence. Each item in the sequence has XDM type information associated with it, such as its node type e.g. element(), document-node() or an XDM atomic type such as xs:string, xs:integer or xs:dateTime. XDM type information in XQJ can be retrieved via the XQItemType interface.

Atomic XQuery items can be easily cast to Java primitives via XQItemAccessor methods such as getByte() and getFloat(). Also XQuery items and sequences can be serialized to DOM Node, SAX ContentHandler, StAX XMLStreamReader and the generic IO Reader and InputStream classes.

== Examples ==
=== Basic example ===
The following example illustrates creating a connection to an XML Database, submitting an XQuery expression, then processing the results in Java. Once all of the results have been processed, the connection is closed to free up all resources associated with it.

// Create a new connection to an XML database
XQConnection conn = vendorDataSource.getConnection("myUser", "myPassword");

XQExpression expr = conn.createExpression(); // Create a reusable XQuery Expression object

XQResultSequence result = expr.executeQuery(
  "for $n in fn:collection('catalog')//item " +
  "return fn:data($n/name)"); // execute an XQuery expression

// Process the result sequence iteratively
while (result.next()) {
    // Print the current item in the sequence
    System.out.println("Product name: " + result.getItemAsString(null));
}

// Free all resources created by the connection
conn.close();

=== Binding a value to an external variable ===
The following example illustrates how a Java value can be bound to an external variable in an XQuery expression. Assume that the connection conn already exists:

XQExpression expr = conn.createExpression();

// The XQuery expression to be executed
String es = "declare variable $x as xs:integer external;" +
            " for $n in fn:collection('catalog')//item" +
            " where $n/price <= $x" +
            " return fn:data($n/name)";

// Bind a value (21) to an external variable with the QName x
expr.bindInt(new QName("x"), 21, null);

// Execute the XQuery expression
XQResultSequence result = expr.executeQuery(es);

// Process the result (sequence) iteratively
while (result.next()) {
    // Process the result ...
}

== Default data type mapping ==
Mapping between Java and XQuery data types is largely flexible, however the XQJ 1.0 specification does have default mapping rules mapping data types when they are not specified by the user. These mapping rules bear great similarities to the mapping rules found in JAXB.

The following table illustrates the default mapping rules for when binding Java values to external variables in XQuery expressions.

Default conversion rules when mapping from Java data types to XQuery data types
Java Datatype	Default XQuery Data Type(s)
boolean	xs:boolean
byte	xs:byte
byte[]	xs:hexBinary
double	xs:double
float	xs:float
int	xs:int
long	xs:long
short	xs:short
Boolean	xs:boolean
Byte	xs:byte
Float	xs:float
Double	xs:double
Integer	xs:int
Long	xs:long
Short	xs:short
String	xs:string
BigDecimal	xs:decimal
BigInteger	xs:integer
Duration	xs:dayTimeDuration if the Duration Object's state is xs:dayTimeDuration
Duration	xs:yearMonthDuration if the Duration Object's state is xs:yearMonthDuration
Duration	xs:duration if the Duration Object's state is xs:duration
XMLGregorianCalendar	xs:date if the XMLGregorianCalendar Object's state is xs:date
XMLGregorianCalendar	xs:dateTime if the XMLGregorianCalendar Object's state is xs:dateTime
XMLGregorianCalendar	xs:gDay if the XMLGregorianCalendar Object's state is xs:gDay
XMLGregorianCalendar	xs:gMonth if the XMLGregorianCalendar Object's state is xs:gMonth
XMLGregorianCalendar	xs:gMonthDay if the XMLGregorianCalendar Object's state is xs:gMonthDay
XMLGregorianCalendar	xs:gYear if the XMLGregorianCalendar Object's state is xs:gYear
XMLGregorianCalendar	xs:gYearMonth if the XMLGregorianCalendar Object's state is xs:gYearMonth
XMLGregorianCalendar	xs:time if the XMLGregorianCalendar Object's state is xs:time
QName	xs:QName
Document	document-node(element(*, xs:untyped))
DocumentFragment	document-node(element(*, xs:untyped))
Element	element(*, xs:untyped)
Attr	attribute(*, xs:untypedAtomic)
Comment	comment()
ProcessingInstruction	processing-instruction()
Text	text()

== Known implementations ==
=== Native XML databases ===
The following is a list of Native XML Databases which are known to have XQuery API for Java implementations.

- MarkLogic
- eXist
- BaseX
- Sedna
- Oracle XDB
- Tamino
- TigerLogic

=== Relational databases ===
DataDirect provide XQJ adapters for relational databases, by translating XQuery code into SQL on the fly, then converting SQL result sets into a format suitable for XQJ to process further. The following is a couple of known implementations.

- Oracle DB (Not XDB)
- IBM Db2
- Microsoft SQL Server
- Sybase ASE
- Informix
- MySQL
- PostgreSQL

=== Non-database implementations ===
The following is a list of non-database XQuery processors which provide an XQuery API for Java interface (typically allowing query against documents parsed from XML in filestore, and held in memory as DOM or similar trees).

- Saxon XSLT and XQuery processor
- Zorba
- MXQuery
- Oracle XQuery Processor

== License ==
The specification is marked as "Copyright © 2003, 2006 - 2009 Oracle. All rights reserved."

The specification contains two separate licenses: a "specification license" and a "reference implementation license".

The specification license allows free copying of the specification provided that copyright notices are retained; it also grants a license to create and distribute an implementation of the specification provided that it fully implements the entire specification, that it does not modify or extend any interfaces, and that it passes the compatibility tests.

This provision has caused some controversy. Firstly, it is not universally accepted that implementing a published specification is something that requires a license (that is, that copyright law would disallow this in the absence of a license). Secondly, the license does not meet the criteria to qualify as an open source license (see Open Source Definition), because of the ban on making extensions and modifications. This has led some open source enthusiasts to challenge whether XQJ implementations can ever be considered truly open source.

The license for the reference implementation is a fairly conventional BSD-style open source license.
