= TigerLogic =

American software company

TigerLogic Corp
- Type: Private
- Industry: Internet, Software
- Founded: August 1987
- Fate: multidimensional database products sold to Rocket Software; Postano products sold to Sprinklr; Omnis
- Headquarters: Irvine, California, USA
- Key people: Roger Rowe, Acting CEO/CFO
- Products: Data Management and Rapid Application Deployment software
- Number of employees: 60+ (June 22, 2015)
- Website: tigerlogiccorp.com

TigerLogic Corporation is an American internet and software development company that designed, developed, sold and supported software infrastructure products. This software was categorized into the following product lines: Yolink search enhancement technology, XML Data Management Server (XDMS), Multidimensional Data Management System (MDMS) and Rapid Application Development (RAD) software tools.

== History ==
The company was originally formed as Blyth Holdings, Inc. and incorporated in the State of Delaware in August 1987, but the name was changed to Omnis Technology Corporation in September 1997. Effective December 1, 2000, the company completed the acquisition of PickAx, Inc., a Delaware corporation. Concurrent with the acquisition, the company changed the name from Pick Systems to Raining Data Corporation. On April 17, 2008, the company changed the name to TigerLogic Corporation and relocated its headquarters to Irvine, California, in June 2015.

The principal asset of PickAX was PICK Systems acquired from the estate of Richard Pick, the founder of Pick Systems. PICK Systems was incorporated in California in November 1982.

- 2000: Definitive merger agreement between Omnis and PICK. Name changed to Raining Data Corporation integrating two companies to create an enterprise to take advantage of emerging trends in cross-platform, web-enabled, data-intensive business applications.
- 2002: Raining Data, a long time provider of scalable data management software focuses company on XML market initiatives with new XML data management solutions that streamline access to a variety of critical business data.
- 2002: Raining Data announces the developer release of TigerLogic XML Data Management Server (XDMS) V1.0 on Windows 2000 and Windows XP Platforms.
- 2003: Availability of TigerLogic XDMS 1.1. supports Solaris, Windows 2000 and Windows XP environments and includes patent-pending technology that significantly boosts the performance and efficiency of data architectures.
- 2007: Major new 3.0 release of TigerLogic XDMS software that supports the January 2007 W3C XQuery 1.0 specification and an XQuery API for Java interface.
- 2008: TigerLogic announces new Web search product called Yolink, a web browser-based application that enhances the search experience of any popular search engine or Web page; company changes name from Raining Data.
- 2009: TigerLogic Corporation Releases Yolink 3.1 with Google Docs and Diigo Integration.
- 2009: TigerLogic Corporation Unveils Yolink 1.0 Developer Beta for Google Chrome Browser, with Google Docs Integration.
- 2010: TigerLogic Announces Major Releases of Its Next-Generation Database Management System.
- 2010: TigerLogic Announces Release of Mobile Apps Development Tool for the Apple iPhone, iPad, and iPod Touch.
- 2010: TigerLogic Launches PostPost, a Real-Time Facebook Newspaper.
- 2011: TigerLogic Launches PostPost App in Google Chrome Web Store.
- 2011: TigerLogic Launches Postano, a Social Media Postcasting Platform.
- 2012: TigerLogic signs definitive agreement to acquire mobile app publisher Storycode, Inc.
- 2013: Rocket Software Acquires TigerLogic's MultiValue Database Business.
- 2014: TigerLogic Announces Appointment of Brad Timchuk as CEO and Justin Garrity as President.
- 2016: Rather than dissolving, TigerLogic initiates a major restructuring. Postano is sold to Sprinklr, and the company reorients itself around full-stack software development and cloud services, building specialized teams for mobile, AI, and enterprise solutions.

== Products and services ==
Many of the company's products are based on the Pick Universal Data Model (“Pick UDM”). The Pick UDM is a core component across the XDMS and MDMS product lines.

Beginning in 2001, the company began an extensive effort to leverage the time-proven Pick UDM and core intellectual property to create the TigerLogic technology product line, which includes:

- A web browser-based search application called "Yolink".
- An enterprise class XML Database Management Server for the emerging XML market to address the growing need for managing and querying native XML data and the ability to handle structured and unstructured data.

=== TigerLogic Yolink ===
In April 2008, the company publicly released a web browser-based search application for beta testing.

In early 2009, the company re-designed and renamed the application to "Yolink".

In November 2010, the company announced Yolink for Safari.

=== TigerLogic Postano (formerly PostPost) ===
PostPost was launched in December 2010 and enabled users to quickly skim relevant passages of text shared by their Facebook friends and sort shared content by type.

In June 2011, TigerLogic announced the release of Postano, an evolution of their former product PostPost. The Postano platform allows brands to consolidate social media and news activity from across the Web and incorporate posts on their websites.

In November 2013, TigerLogic announced the release of Postano 2.0, a significant update to the social curation, fan engagement, and visualization platform.

In April 2017, Tiger Logic was sold to Cliftech Solutions LLC

=== TigerLogic XML Data Management Server (XDMS) ===
TigerLogic XDMS was an enterprise native XML database management server with both data- and document-centric capabilities. The TigerLogic XDMS difference comes from its core technology: a data model that is optimal for managing and storing any kind of XML or non-XML data and its extensible XQuery Engine.

=== Rapid Application Development (RAD) tools ===
The company's RAD products support the full life cycle of software application development and are designed for rapid prototyping, development, and deployment of GUI client/server and Web applications.

The company's TigerLogic Dashboard product was a development tool to produce graphical reports of real-time business intelligence via dashboard widgets. The TigerLogic Dashboard enables developers of the D3 multidimensional database management system to select and present critical business data, that's distributed throughout the database environment, to be presented in intuitive and Web-based graphical interfaces.

=== Multidimensional Databases (MDMS) ===
The MDMS product line consists principally of the D3 database management system (“D3”), which runs on many operating systems, such as IBM AIX, Linux and Microsoft Windows. Latest release includes bundled support for both .NET and Java development environments; and support for integration with the TigerLogic XDMS product.

In addition to standard development libraries TigerLogic has just released a MVS toolkit to enable the development of web services on their D3 and Mentor (MVbase) Products. This tool kit is free to customers with a support contract.

On November 18, 2013, Rocket Software announced its acquisition of the MDMS and D3 products from TigerLogic.

== Restatement ==
On February 14, 2002, the company restated financial statements downward by about $2 million to reflect accounting misapplications regarding acquisitions in 2000.
