= XUpdate =

XUpdate is a lightweight XML query language for modifying XML data. After some early enthusiastic development by a small team, the development of the standard faltered around the end of 2000 and it has never found widespread adoption. However, it has found a niche market of users not content to wait for the XQuery Update Facility extension of the W3C standard, XQuery.
