= Amalto =

French software development company

Amalto Technologies S.A.
- Type: Private
- Industry: Software
- Founded: 2005
- Headquarters: Paris, France
- Number of locations: 3
- Key people: Emmanuel Thiriez (CEO); Choucri Fahed (CTO); Bryan Pederson (CEO Amalto North America)
- Products: B2B document exchange software
- Number of employees: ~25
- Website: www.amalto.com

Amalto Technologies S.A. was a software development company based in Paris, France. The company developed and operated business-to-business (B2B) document exchange software solutions and provides system integration services. It serves the oil & gas, industrial, environmental and enterprise markets.

Amalto Technologies is a private company owned by its management, employees and venture capitalists. It has offices in the US (Houston), France (Paris) and Canada (Calgary).

== History ==
The company was founded in 2005 in Paris by four individuals who had either launched e-procurement projects as employees of oil and gas companies, or worked as suppliers to these companies and other operators.

In 2008, Chevron selected Amalto's b2een solution to enable electronic transactions with its suppliers.

In June 2009, Amalto Technologies closed a class A share sale to Succès Europe, a French angel investor holding.

Amalto developed a master data management (MDM) product Xtentis by 2008. It was based on a native XML database and leveraged open-source technology, such as eXist XML server and JBoss.

In September 2009, Xtentis was acquired by Talend, a French open source software vendor. In January 2010, the system was released as an open source product under name Talend MDM (delivered as a free open source version Talend Open Studio for MDM and subscription-based Talend Platform for MDM). It became the first open source MDM solution on the market.

In February 2011, the company launched Amalto e-Business Cloud, a B2B electronic document exchange solution for trading partner collaboration.

On 6 April 2021, Sidetrade announced the acquisition of Amalto for $16m.

== Products and services ==
Amalto's main offering is the e-Business Cloud, a private-cloud fully-managed solution supporting electronic B2B transactions with trading partners (clients, suppliers, logistics providers, ...) and automating business processes such as Order-to-Cash.

== Clients ==
Amalto provides services to such corporations as Chevron, GE Grid Solutions, Suez, Thales Group, Iron Mountain, Clean Harbors, National Oilwell Varco (NOV). As of 2011, over 20% of electronic invoices sent to Chevron by its suppliers were dispatched using software of Amalto.

Amalto focuses on "mid tier" suppliers, which send hundreds of invoices per year, which is a lot of manual work, but not enough for them to justify investing in more expensive electronic data interchange (EDI) systems for handling purchases. Amalto worked with such suppliers as Mullen Group, Dixie Electric, Complete Production Services, Stallion Oilfield Holdings and others.

== Recognition ==
Amalto was rated by Gartner to be one of the three Cool Vendors in Platform and Integration Middleware in 2009.
