= Vndc =

VNDC
Development
- Developer: VNDC Holding PTE. LTD.

VNDC is a stablecoin that’s claimed to be pegged 1:1 to the Vietnamese đồng. It has been widely adopted by the Vietnamese cryptocurrency community for trading and transactions.

== Technology ==
VNDC is built on multiple blockchain platforms, including Ethereum blockchain using the ERC-20 standard and Binance Chain using the BEP-20standard. The stablecoin maintains a 1:1 peg with the Vietnamese đồng, making it popular among Vietnamese cryptocurrency traders for exchanges and commerce.

== Platform integration ==
VNDC is primarily integrated with the ONUS exchange platform, which evolved from the original VNDC Wallet application in November 2021. According to financial media reports, the ONUS trading platform has approximately 1.5 million users.

== Regulatory concerns ==
Vietnamese financial media have raised questions about VNDC's legal status, noting that cryptocurrency is not recognized as a legal payment method in Vietnam under current law. The issuing and use of unauthorized payment methods may be subject to criminal prosecution under Article 206 of Vietnam's 2015 Criminal Code.

Financial experts have expressed concerns about money laundering risks associated with stablecoins, particularly given Vietnam's limited regulatory framework for cryptocurrency oversight.

== Security incidents ==
In December 2021, VNDC gained international attention following a major security breach involving the associated ONUS platform. Hackers exploited the Log4Shell vulnerability, compromising the personal information of approximately 1.92 million users. The incident was described by Vietnamese media as one of the largest cybersecurity breaches affecting Vietnamese cryptocurrency platforms.

== See also ==
- Stablecoin
- Vietnamese đồng
- Digital currency
- Cryptocurrency and crime
