= Paulo Shakarian =

American artificial intelligence researcher

Paulo Shakarian PhD
- Education: U.S. Military Academy, University of Maryland
- Occupations: Professor, author
- Known for: Artificial intelligence, Cyber security
- Honours: Bronze Star, Army Commendation Medal
- Scientific career
- Workplaces: Syracuse University
- Doctoral advisor: V. S. Subrahmanian

Paulo Shakarian is an American artificial intelligence (AI) researcher. He is the KG Tan Endowed Professor of Artificial Intelligence at Syracuse University, where he is Director of the Syracuse University Institute for Artificial Intelligence.

His work on artificial intelligence and security has been featured in Forbes, the New Yorker, Slate, the Economist, Business Insider, TechCrunch, CNN and BBC. He has authored numerous books on artificial intelligence and the intersection of AI and security. He previously served as a military officer, had experience at DARPA, and co-founded a startup.

== Career and Research ==
Shakarian was a major in the U.S Army serving from 2002 to 2014, undertaking two combat tours in Iraq and earning a Bronze Star and the Army Commendation Medal for valor. While in the army he was trained in Information assurance and completed a bachelor's degree in computer science at the U.S. Military Academy. In 2007 he served as a military fellow at Defense Advanced Research Projects Agency (DARPA). While in uniform, he went on to study a master's degree in computer science at the University of Maryland in 2009, and later a PhD in 2011 under the advisement of V. S. Subrahmanian. His Ph.D. was focused on symbolic artificial intelligence, in particular logic programming, temporal logic, and abductive inference.

After obtaining a PhD he taught at the U.S Military Academy, West Point, as an assistant professor from 2011 to 2014, his final military assignment. In 2014 he took a position as an assistant professor at Arizona State University. He earned his tenure at Arizona State and was promoted to Associate Professor in 2020.

Since 2011 Shakarian has authored six books on subjects relating to his academic career - many of them focused on the intersection between AI, security, and data mining.

In 2017, while maintaining his academic position he co-founded and led (as CEO) Cyber Reconnaissance, Inc., (CYR3CON), a business that specialized in combining artificial intelligence with information mined from malicious hacker communities to avoid cyber-attacks. The company raised $8 million in venture capital and was acquired in 2022.

In June 2025, Shakarian announced that he had left his academic position at Arizona State to become the inaugural KG Tan Endowed Professor of Artificial Intelligence at Syracuse University. In 2026, he assumed a role as Director of the Syracuse University Institute for Artificial Intelligence.

== Notable works ==
=== PyReason ===
In 2023, Shakarian's group released PyReason which is a modern implementation of annotated logic with extensions to support temporal and open-world reasoning. PyReason was used in various collaborations with industry partners. This included work with SSCI where PyReason was used as a "semantic proxy" to replace a simulation for reinforcement learning where it provides a 1000x speedup over native simulation environments for agent policy training and provided transfer of PyReason-trained policies to simulation environments such as AFSIM and SC2. PyReason was also demonstrated as a method for robotic control in a joint ASU-SSCI demonstration. In a separate line of work, under the IARPA HAYSTAC program PyReason was used in a strategy to generate movement trajectories using ideas from abductive inference. Here the authors leveraged properties of logic programming and A* search to generate movement trajectories that met certain criteria but resembled past agent activity.

=== Social Network Diffusion ===
In the 2012 paper “Large social networks can be targeted for viral marketing with small seed sets”, Shakarian introduced a fast, novel method for identifying sets of nodes that can maximize the spread of a contagion in a social network based on the standard “tipping model.” The work was presented in a 2012 ASONAM paper (later extended in a 2013 journal SNAM and described in a 2015 book published by Springer-Nature ). The concept was based around a graph decomposition designed to mimic the inverse of the diffusion process. The work was featured as part of MIT Technology Review’s “Best of 2013” and heralded as solving a “fundamental problem of viral marketing.”

=== AI for Predicting Hacker Actions ===
In 2016, Shakarian’s team introduced a data mining framework in the paper “Darknet and deepnet mining for proactive cybersecurity threat intelligence” (Proc. IEE ISI 2016 and later described in a book published by Cambridge University press in 2017 ) which presented a framework for mining over 40 hacker websites – which not only demonstrated a scalable system for darkweb mining of hacker information, but also allowed for the ability to cross-examine cyber threat actors across multiple online forums – the study identified hundreds of hacker personas who participated in more than three different online marketplaces. The paper became one of the most cited papers of the history of the IEEE ISI conference and received media attention in Forbes and MIT Technology Review.

The following year, Shakarian and his team showed that data gathered from hacker communities on the dark web about specific software vulnerabilities often appeared before the use of zero-day exploits in a paper entitled “Proactive identification of exploits in the wild through vulnerability mentions online”. They found that this information could also be used to create features for machine learning approaches can successfully predict the use of exploits – even when accounting for temporal intermixing of data. The approach was enhanced with follow-on studies were the features were augmented using social network topology data (Proc. ACM CSS 2017 ) and the use of language models (Proc. AAAI 2018).

=== Books ===
- Neuro Symbolic Reasoning and Learning.
- Introduction to Cyber-Warfare: A Multidisciplinary Approach.
- Diffusion in Social Networks (SpringerBriefs in Computer Science).
- Darkweb Cyber Threat Intelligence Mining.
- Artificial Intelligence Tools for Cyber Attribution (SpringerBriefs in Computer Science).
- Cyber Warfare: Building the Scientific Foundation (Advances in Information Security).
- Geospatial Abduction: Principles and Practice.
