= V. S. Subrahmanian =

Indian-American computer scientist

- Born: V. S. (Venkatramanan Siva) Subrahmanian; New Dehli, India
- Education: Birla Institute of Technology and Science (MSc); Syracuse University (MS), (PhD)
- Scientific career
- Fields: Computer science
- Workplaces: University of Maryland, College Park; Dartmouth College; Northwestern University
- Thesis: Computational reasoning with non-classical and paraconsistent logics (1989)
- Doctoral advisor: Howard Arden Blair
- Doctoral students: Paulo Shakarian; Sibel Adalı; Fatma Özcan
- Website: vssubrah.github.io

V.S. Subrahmanian is an Indian-American computer scientist known for his research in machine learning, particularly modeling and predicting behavior for counterterrorism and security-related applications. He is a professor of computer science at Northwestern University, Illinois, US.

Subrahmanian was elected a Fellow of the American Association for the Advancement of Science (AAAS) in 2008 for contributions to computer science and multidisciplinary computing, including techniques for integrating multiple data sources and automatically constructing and forecasting group behavioral models. In 2009, he was elected a Fellow of the Association for the Advancement of Artificial Intelligence (AAAI) for contributions to probabilistic database, logic programming, and intelligent agent-based systems. In 2022, Subrahmanian was named a Fellow of the Asia-Pacific Artificial Intelligence Association (AAIA) and was named to the Institute of Electrical and Electronics Engineers (EEEI) Computer Society's Golden Core.

== Education ==
Subrahmanian received an M.Sc. (Tech.) degree from the Birla Institute of Technology and Science (BITS), then a Master of Science and a PhD in computer science from Syracuse University. Advised by Howard A. Blair, his PhD thesis is entitled "Computational reasoning with non-classical and paraconsistent logics."

Subrahmanian spent five years as an assistant professor, five years as an associate professor with tenure, then seventeen years as a full professor with tenure at the University of Maryland, College Park. He joined the Dartmouth College faculty in 2017, and subsequently moved to Northwestern University in 2021. At Northwestern, Subrahmanian is the Walter P. Murphy Professor of Computer Science, a Northwestern Buffet Faculty Fellow, and is the principal investigator the Northwestern Security and Artificial Intelligence Laboratory (NSAIL).

== Research ==
=== Counterterrorism and national security ===
Beginning in the 2000s, Subrahmanian began research in applying artificial intelligence, databases, and predictive modeling to national security problems. His research has examined how large collections of text, geospatial, and social-network data can be used to model the behavior of terrorist and other sociocultural groups to forecast their actions. In October 2024, Subrahmanian created and has led the Northwestern Terror Early Warning System, which releases monthly forecasts about the behavior of Abu Sayyaf, Al-Shabaab, Boko Haram, Indian Mujahideen, Jama'at Nusrat al-Islam wal-Muslimin, and Lashkar-e-Taiba. Reports are sent to approximately sixty government and private entities, including the United Nations.

Subrahmanian has also examined the implications of artificial intelligence for terrorism and international security. In 2026, he co-authored a report with Daniel Byman on the potential effects of AI on terrorism, including its implications for extremist propaganda, recruitment, and disinformation.

=== Databases and knowledge representation ===
Subrahmanian's research in databases has focused on the integration and reasoning over heterogeneous sources of information. He authored Principles of Multimedia Database Systems, first published in 1998, which provided a comprehensive treatment of the querying of multimedia databases.

=== Probabilistic logic programming ===
Subrahmanian made early contributions to the field of probabilistic logic programming, including developing one of the first formal semantics for probabilistic logic programs. Subrahmanian also work on annotated logic programming, including inventing generalized annotated programs (GAPs) with Michael Kifer, a formalism designed to reason about multiple forms of uncertainty, time, and paraconsistency within a single framework.

=== Deepfakes and synthetic media ===
Subrahmanian has researched audio and video deepfakes from a national-security and international-conflict problem. With the Brookings Institution and Georgetown University, he developed the "Deepfakes Equities Process," a framework to study the potential use of deepfakes by governments in international conflict.

Subrahmanian has also worked on the detection and verification of synthetic media. In 2024, his research group created the Global Online Deepfake Detection System (GODDS), which is a website designed to help verified journalists determine whether certain audio, images, and videos artifacts are authentic or manipulated by AI. GODDS combines roughly eighty automated deepfake-detection models with human analysis and contextual information about the subject and circumstances depicted in the media. Unlike systems that evaluate only the digital artifact, GODDS incorporates contextual information and human analysis into its assessments.

== See also ==
- List of Indian scientists
