= LMAX Group =

Financial technology company

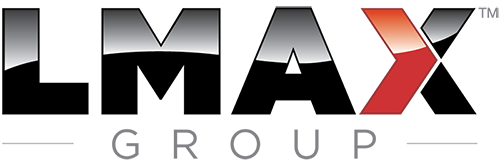
- Type: Privately held company
- Industry: Foreign Exchange Market
- Founded: 2010; 16 years ago
- Headquarters: London, United Kingdom
- Products: Contract for difference
- Brands: LMAX Exchange
- Revenue: ▲£149.36 million (2024)
- Net income: ▲£56.62 million (2024)
- Total assets: ▲£682.55 million (2024)
- Total equity: ▲£114.53 million (2024)
- Number of employees: approximately 250 (2025)
- Website: website

LMAX Group is a financial betting company based in London, UK.

== History ==
Betfair and Goldman Sachs set up the LMAX Group in 2010 because Betfair wanted to find other uses for its sports betting software. LMAX enabled its customers to bet on whether a company's share price would go up or down. They referred to these bets as contracts for difference.

The company also open-sourced some components of its technology, including its Disruptor concurrency software, to support the low latency requirements of its trade processing servers.

It claims to have published a transaction cost analysis (TCA) white paper resulting in the development of FX TCA methodology and analytical tools.

In July 2021, private equity firm JC Flowers agreed to pay US$300 million to acquire a 30% stake in LMAX, bringing the valuation of the Group to $1 billion.

== Subsidiaries ==
LMAX Exchange operates foreign exchanges and a Financial Conduct Authority (FCA) regulated multilateral trading facility (MTF).
