= Zorba (XQuery processor) =

Open-source query processor

- Initial release: 2008
- Final release: 3.1 / June 31, 2015; 10 years ago
- Repository: github.com/28msec/zorba
- Written in: C++
- Type: XQuery engine
- License: Apache-2.0

Zorba is an open source query processor written in C++, implementing

- several W3C XQuery and XML specifications and
- the JSONiq language for processing JSON data.

Zorba is distributed under Apache License, Version 2.0. The project is mainly supported by the FLWOR Foundation, Oracle, and 28msec.

Zorba isn't under active development any more. The GitHub repo's last commit is from 2017 while the last release 3.1 is from June 2015; the latest version 2.9.1 on SourceForge dates from May 2013.

== Specifications ==
Zorba provides the implementation of the following W3C specifications:

- XQuery 1.0
- XQuery 3.0
- XQuery Update Facility 1.0
- XQuery and XPath Full Text 1.0
- XML Syntax for XQuery 1.0
- XML Schema
- XSL Transformations (XSLT)
- XSL Formatting Objects

Zorba also provides implementations of:

- JSONiq
- Scripting Extension
- Data Definition Facility

=== Scripting ===
Scripting Extension is an open specification that provides semantic for side-effects in XQuery or JSONiq programs. It also provides a user-friendly syntax for imperative programming within such programs. The following code snippet is an example of the Scripting syntax. It computes a sequence containing all the Fibonacci numbers that are less than 100.

(: this is a variable declaration statement :)
variable $a as xs:integer := 0;
variable $b as xs:integer := 1;
variable $c as xs:integer := $a + $b;
variable $fibseq as xs:integer* := ($a, $b);

while ($c lt 100) {
   (: this is a variable assignment statement :)
   $fibseq := ($fibseq, $c);
   $a := $b;
   $b := $c;
   $c := $a + $b;
}
$fibseq

The following is an example of CRUD operations using Scripting, XQuery, and XQuery Update.

variable $stores := doc("stores.xml")/stores;

(: Create :)
insert node <store><store-number>4</store-number><state>NY</state></store> into $stores;

(: Update :)
replace value of node $stores/store[state="NY"]/store-number with "5";

(: Delete :)
delete node $stores/store[state != "NY"];

(: Read :)
$stores

=== Data Definition Facility ===
Data Definition Facility provides a semantic for persistent artifacts such as collections and indexes in XQuery or JSONiq programs. For instance, the following code snippets declares a collection named entries and an index on that collection named entry.

module namespace g = "http://www.zorba-xquery.com/guestbook";

import module namespace db = "http://www.zorba-xquery.com/modules/store/static/collections/dml";

declare namespace an = "http://www.zorba-xquery.com/annotations";

(: Declares a collection named entries :)
declare collection g:entries as element(entry);
(: Declares a variable that points to the g:entries collection :)
declare variable $g:entries := xs:QName('g:entries');

(: Declares an index named entry on top of the entries collection :)
declare %an:automatic %value-equality index g:entry
  on nodes db:collection(xs:QName('g:entries'))
  by xs:string(@id) as xs:string;

== Storage ==
Zorba provides a pluggable store so it can be used on different kind of environments: disk, database, browser. By default, Zorba is built with a main memory store. 28msec implements a store on top of MongoDB. The XQuery in the Browser project has built a browser plugin for Zorba and leverages the DOM as its store.

== APIs ==
Zorba is usable through different host languages: C++, C, XQJ / Java, PHP, Python, C#, Ruby, and even XQuery/JSONiq.

Zorba is also available as a command-line tool.

XQDT is an XQuery plugin for the Eclipse (IDE). It fully supports Zorba API and syntax.

== Modules ==
Zorba provides more than 70 XQuery modules for building applications. Some of these modules are:

- File system, Email, HTTP client, OAuth client
- XQuery and JSONiq Data Model Processing: typing, atomic items, and nodes.
- Full-text: tokenizer, stemmer, thesaurus lookup.
- Data Cleaning: phonetic similarities, set similarities, conversions.
- Data Conversion: Base64, CSV, HTML, JSON, XML
- Data Formatting: XSL-FO
- Introspection and Reflection
- Cryptography
- Image processing
