= EXist =

eXist-db
- Original authors: Wolfgang Meier, Leif Jöran Olson, Adam Retter, Dannes Wessels, Patrick Brihaye
- Developer: eXist-db maintainers
- Release: 2000
- Stable release: 6.4.1 / March 6, 2026; 4 months ago
- Preview release: 7.0.0-beta3 / June 2, 2026; 45 days ago
- Written in: Java, XQuery, XSLT, JavaScript
- Operating system: Linux, Mac, Windows
- Platform: Java
- Standards: XML, XQuery, XSLT, XPath, XUpdate, XQJ, DTD, XML Schema, RelaxNG
- Type: Document-oriented_database NoSQL
- License: GNU LGPL v2.1.
- Website: www.exist-db.org
- Repository: github.com/exist-db/exist/

eXist-db (or eXist for short) is an open source software project for NoSQL databases built on XML technology. It is classified as both a NoSQL document-oriented database system and a native XML database (and it provides support for XML, JSON, HTML and Binary documents). Unlike most relational database management systems (RDBMS) and NoSQL databases, eXist-db provides XQuery and XSLT as its query and application programming languages.

eXist-db is released under version 2.1 of the GNU LGPL.

== Features ==
eXist-db allows software developers to persist XML/JSON/Binary documents without writing extensive middleware. eXist-db follows and extends many W3C XML standards such as XQuery. eXist-db also supports REST interfaces for interfacing with AJAX-type web forms. Applications such as XForms may save their data by using just a few lines of code. The WebDAV interface to eXist-db allows users to "drag and drop" XML files directly into the eXist-db database. eXist-db automatically indexes documents using a keyword indexing system.

== History ==
eXist-db was created in 2000 by Wolfgang Meier.

eXist-db was awarded the best XML database of the year by InfoWorld in 2006.

The companies eXist Solutions GmbH in Germany, and Evolved Binary in the UK, promote and provide support for the software.

There is an O'Reilly book for eXist-db which is co-authored by Adam Retter and Erik Siegel.

Version	Release date	Changes
6.0.0	January 27, 2022	Fixes for Log4Shell vulnerability and breaking changes to bundled Apache XML-RPC libraries to resolve security issues.
5.0.0	September 2, 2019	More than 1,400 commits including improvements to document and collection locking, migration of build system from Apache Ant to Apache Maven, support removed for running eXist-db in Apache Tomcat.
4.0.0	February 14, 2018	New UserManager application, Cache Extension Module rewritten to use more performant Caffeine Java library, improvements to language search support, backward compatible with v3.
3.0.0	February 9, 2017	Almost 1,500 changes including support for XQuery v3.1, and updated version of Jetty with HTTP/2 support. Java 8 is now a requirement.
2.0.0	February 2013	Not backward compatible with v1. Changes to permission system to more closely follow UNIX permission model, web applications are stored in database rather than in webapp directory.
1.0.0	October 2006	

== Supported standards and technologies ==
eXist-db has support for the following standards and technologies:

- XPath - XML Path language
- XQuery - XML Query language
- XSLT - Extensible Stylesheet Language Transformations
- XSL-FO - XSL Formatting Objects
- WebDAV - Web distributed authoring and versioning
- REST - Representational state transfer (URL encoding)
- RESTXQ - RESTful annotations for XQuery
- XInclude - server-side include file processing (limited support)
- XML-RPC - a remote procedure call protocol
- XProc - a XML Pipeline processing language
- XQuery API for Java

== See also ==
- BaseX - another Open Source Native XML Database
- CouchDB - a document-oriented database based on JSON
