= XQuery Update Facility =

Extension to XML Query Language

XQuery Update Facility is an extension to the XML Query language, XQuery. It provides expressions that can be used to make changes to instances of the XQuery 1.0 and XPath 2.0 Data Model.

It became a W3C Candidate Recommendation on 31 July 2009 and was finalised as Recommendation on 17 March 2011.

A version to work with XQuery 3.0 was drafted, but was never completed, and is archived as a W3C Working Group Note.

== Implementations ==
- BaseX - An open source XML Database and XQuery Processor; supported since Version 6.0
- DataDirect XQuery - a java-based commercial XQuery processor. Supported since Version 4.0
- EMC Documentum xDB - Native XML Database. XQuery Update Facility supported since Version 9.0
- eXist - The open source XML Database provide an extension to XQuery, which maps each of the XUpdate instructions to a corresponding XQuery expression
- MonetDB/XQuery - An open source XQuery processor on top of the MonetDB relational database system (declared obsolete since 2011).
- PureXML - IBM DB2 offers XQuery Update Facility since Version 9.5.
- Oracle XMLDB - Oracle database offers XQuery Update Facility since version 12.1.0.2).
- qizxopen XQuery engine.
- SaxonSA XSLT and XQuery Processor - by Michael Kay; Supported since Version 9.1, but only in the commercial version.
- XQilla - An open source (ASL2.0) XQuery processing library with support for the latest XQuery Update features. XQilla is written in C++ and includes a command line executable shell to execute queries against XML content stored on a local filesystem. This library is actively developed and part of a supported Oracle product, Berkeley DB XML.
