= Vince Calhoun =

American engineer and neuroscientist (born 1967)

Vince D. Calhoun
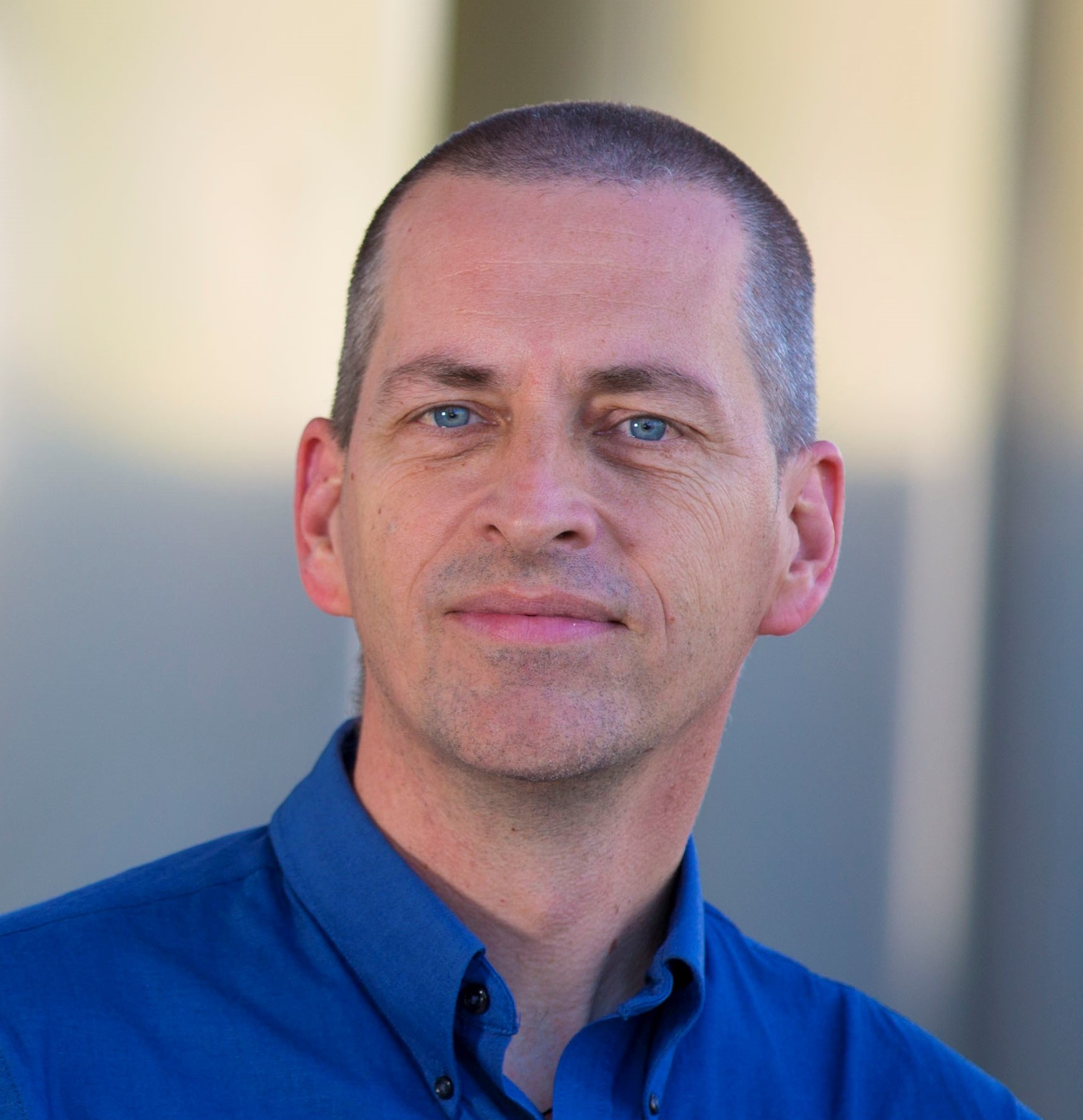
- Born: 1 October 1967 (age 59)
- Education: University of Maryland, Baltimore County
- Scientific career
- Fields: Electrical engineering
- Workplaces: Tri-institutional Center; Georgia Institute of Technology; University of New Mexico
- Doctoral advisor: Tülay Adalı

Vince Daniel Calhoun is an American engineer and neuroscientist. He directs the Tri-institutional Center for Translational Research in Neuroimaging and Data Science (TReNDS), a partnership between Georgia State University, Georgia Institute of Technology, and Emory University, and holds faculty appointments at all three institutions. He was formerly the President of the Mind Research Network and a Distinguished Professor of Electrical and Computer Engineering at the University of New Mexico.

== Education ==
1. B.S. in electrical engineering, University of Kansas, Lawrence, KS (1991)
2. M.A. in biomedical engineering, Johns Hopkins University, Baltimore, MD (1993)
3. M.S. in information systems, Johns Hopkins University, Baltimore, MD (1996)
4. Ph.D. in electrical engineering, University of Maryland, Baltimore County, Baltimore, MD (2002).

== Career ==
Calhoun is an expert on brain imaging acquisition and analysis and has created numerous algorithms for making sense of complex brain imaging data. He is the creator of the group independent component analysis algorithm, which has become widely used for extracting 'networks' of coherent activity from functional magnetic resonance imaging (fMRI) data. He was also an early innovator in approaches to characterizing the dynamics of brain connectivity. He has also developed techniques to link many different types of data, called 'data fusion' including various types of brain imaging (structural, functional, connectivity) with genomic and epigenomic data. A key focus of Calhoun's work is the development of tool to identify brain imaging markers to help identify and potentially treat various brain disorders including schizophrenia, bipolar disorder, autism, Alzheimer's disease, and many more.

== Awards ==
Calhoun is a fellow of the Institute of Electrical and Electronics Engineers (IEEE), The American Association for the Advancement of Science (AAAS), The American Institute for Medical and Biological Engineering, The American College of Neuropsychopharmacology, and the International Society of Magnetic Resonance in Medicine (ISMRM).
