= Sibel Adalı =

Turkish-American computer scientist

Sibel Adalı is a Turkish-American computer scientist who studies trust in social networks and uncertainty in decision-making. She is a professor of computer science at Rensselaer Polytechnic Institute and the associate dean for research in the Rensselaer School of Science.

== Education and career ==
Adalı graduated in 1991 from Bilkent University, with a bachelor's degree in computer engineering and information science. She went to the University of Maryland, College Park for her graduate studies in computer science, earning a master's degree in 1994 and completing her Ph.D. in 1996. Her dissertation, Query Processing in Heterogeneous Mediated Systems, was supervised by V. S. Subrahmanian.

She became a faculty member at Rensselaer Polytechnic Institute in 1996.

== Book ==
Adalı wrote the book Modeling Trust Context in Networks (Springer, 2013).

== Personal ==
Adalı maintains a website of Turkish poetry, with translations into many other languages.

She is the sister of electrical engineer Tülay Adalı.
