= Journal of Cosmetic & Laser Therapy =

- Discipline: Cosmetic surgery
- Language: English
- Edited by: Nima Gharavi, MD, PhD

Publication details
- History: 1999-present
- Publisher: Taylor & Francis
- Frequency: Bimonthly
- Impact factor: 1.110 (2014)

Standard abbreviations
- ISO 4: J. Cosmet. Laser Ther.

Indexing
- ISSN: 1476-4172 (print); 1476-4180 (web)
- OCLC no.: 50190952

Links
- Journal homepage; Online access; Online archive

The Journal of Cosmetic & Laser Therapy is a bimonthly peer-reviewed medical journal covering applications of cosmetic laser and light therapies on the skin. It is published by Informa and the editor-in-chief is Dr. Nima Gharavi (Beverly Hills, CA). The journal was established in 1999. According to the Journal Citation Reports, the journal has a 2024 impact factor of 1.6.
