= Tülay Adalı =

Professor of Computer Science and Electrical Engineering

- Education: Middle East Technical University (BS); North Carolina State University (PhD)
- Scientific career
- Fields: Electrical engineering
- Workplaces: University of Maryland, Baltimore County
- Doctoral students: Vince Calhoun

Tülay Adalı is a Distinguished University Professor of Computer Science and Electrical Engineering at the University of Maryland, Baltimore County, whose research interests include signal processing, machine learning, and data fusion.

With Simon Haykin, she is the author of the book Adaptive Signal Processing: Next Generation Solutions (Wiley, 2010), and with Eric Moreau, she is the author of Blind Identification and Separation of Complex-valued Signals (Wiley, 2013).

In 2008 she became a Fellow of the American Institute for Medical and Biological Engineering "for outstanding research, mentorship, and leadership in the field of biomedical imaging and signal processing", and in 2009 she became a Fellow of the Institute of Electrical and Electronics Engineers "For contributions to nonlinear and complex-valued statistical signal processing". She was an IEEE Signal Processing Society Distinguished Lecturer for 2012–2013, and has been named a Fulbright Scholar for 2015.

She is the sister of computer scientist Sibel Adalı.
