= Apache Commons Logging =

Logging model and program

- Developer: Apache Software Foundation
- Stable release: 1.3.4 / August 16, 2024; 23 months ago
- Written in: Java
- Operating system: Cross-platform
- Type: Logging Tool
- License: Apache License 2.0
- Website: commons.apache.org/proper/commons-logging/
- Repository: github.com/apache/commons-logging

Apache Commons Logging (previously known as Jakarta Commons Logging or JCL) is a Java-based logging utility and a programming model for logging and for other toolkits. It provides APIs, log implementations, and wrapper implementations over some other tools.

== Log level ==
The following table defines the log levels and messages in Apache Commons Logging, in decreasing order of severity. The left column lists the log level designation in and the right column provides a brief description of each log level.

Level	Description
fatal	Severe errors that cause premature termination. Expect these to be immediately visible on a status console.
error	Other runtime errors or unexpected conditions. Expect these to be immediately visible on a status console.
warn	Use of deprecated APIs, poor use of API, 'almost' errors, other runtime situations that are undesirable or unexpected, but not necessarily "wrong". Expect these to be immediately visible on a status console.
info	Interesting runtime events (startup/shutdown). Expect these to be immediately visible on a console, so be conservative and keep to a minimum.
debug	Detailed information on the flow through the system. Expect these to be written to logs only.
trace	Most detailed information. Expect these to be written to logs only.

== Configuration ==
Two basic abstractions, Log and LogFactory, are used in Apache Commons Logging.

== Example ==
Sample code may look as follows:

package com.cascadetg.ch09;

import org.apache.commons.logging.Log;
import org.apache.commons.logging.LogFactory;
import org.apache.commons.logging.impl.Jdk14Logger;

public class LogGenerator
{
  // Note that you pass in an instance of this class to the
  // log generator. This allows you to find the messages
  // generated by this class.
  private static Log log = LogFactory.getLog(LogGenerator.class);

  public static void configJDKLogger()
  {
    try
    {
      ((Jdk14Logger)log).getLogger().setLevel(
java.util.logging.Level.ALL);
      ((Jdk14Logger)log).getLogger().addHandler(
(java.util.logging.FileHandler)Class
        .forName("java.util.logging.FileHandler")
        .newInstance());

      System.out.println("Added JDK 1.4 file handler");
    } catch (Exception e)
    {
      System.out.println("Unable to load JDK 1.4 logging.");
      e.printStackTrace();
    }
  }

  public static void main(String[] args)
  {
    configJDKLogger();
    System.setErr(System.out);

    System.out.println();
    System.out.println("Test fatal log");

    try
    {
      String foo = null;
      int x = 0 / (new Integer(foo)).intValue();
    } catch (Exception e)
    {
      log.fatal(e.getMessage(), e);
    }

    System.out.println();
    System.out.println("Test error log");

    try
    {
      Object foo = null;
      foo.toString();
    } catch (Exception e)
    {
      log.error(e.getMessage(), e);
    }

    System.out.println();
    System.out.println("Test warn log");
    try
    {
      Class.forName("com.cascadetg.NonexistentClass");
    } catch (Exception e)
    {
      log.warn("Can't find a nonexistent class!");
    }

    System.out.println();
    System.out.println("Test info log");

    log.info("Starting app!");
    log.info("Quitting app!");

    System.out.println();
    System.out.println("Test debug log");

    if (1 > 2)
    {
      log.debug("1 > 2 evaluated true");
      if (10 % 2 == 0)
        log.debug("10 % 2 is 0");
      else
        log.debug("10 % 2 is not 0");
    } else
    {
      log.debug("1 > 2 evaluated false");
    }

    System.out.println();
    System.out.println("Test trace log");

    log.trace("Calling trace method.");
    log.trace("Calling trace method.");
    log.trace("Calling trace method.");
    log.trace("Calling trace method.");
    log.trace("Calling trace method.");

    System.out.println();
    System.out.println("Log test complete.");
  }
}

== See also ==
- log4j
- Chainsaw (log file viewer)
- commons-logging on GitHub
