= XML database =

Database presenting data in XML formats

An XML database is a data persistence software system that allows data to be specified, and stored, in XML format. This data can be queried, transformed, exported and returned to a calling system. XML databases are a flavor of document-oriented databases which are in turn a category of database.Relational database management systems continue to support XML storage and processing alongside relational data. For example, Microsoft SQL Server supports an XML data type and XML schema collections, which can be used to validate XML documents and provide type information for stored data.

== Rationale for XML as a database format ==
Reasons to store data in XML format as an XML database include:

- An enterprise may have numerous XML documents with similar data, but dispersed in different XML formats. Conglomerating this data into a singular, standardized XML database structure will avoid compatibility issues
- Data may need to be exposed or ingested as XML, so using another format such as relational forces double-modeling of the data
- XML is very well suited to parse data, deeply nested data and mixed content (such as text with embedded markup tags)
- XML is human readable whereas relational tables require expertise to access
- Metadata is often available as XML
- Semantic web data is available as RDF/XML
- Provides a solution for Object-relational impedance mismatch
- Compatibility with XML use on the data transport layer

== XML-enabled databases ==
XML-enabled databases typically offer one or more of the following approaches to storing XML within the traditional relational structure:

1. XML is stored into a CLOB (Character large object)
2. XML is "shredded" into a series of tables based on a schema
3. XML is stored into a native XML Type as defined by ISO Standard 9075-14

RDBMS that support the ISO XML Type are:

1. IBM DB2 (pureXML)
2. Microsoft SQL Server
3. Oracle Database
4. PostgreSQL

Typically an XML-enabled database is best suited where the majority of data are non-XML. For datasets where the majority of data are XML, a native XML database is better suited.

=== Example of XML Type Query in IBM DB2 SQL ===
select
   id, vol, xmlquery('$j/name', passing journal as "j") as name 
from
   journals
where 
   xmlexists('$j[licence="CreativeCommons"]', passing journal as "j")

== Native XML databases ==
Native XML databases are especially tailored for working with XML data. As managing XML as large strings would be inefficient, and due to the hierarchical nature of XML, custom optimized data structures are used for storage and querying. This usually increases performance both in terms of read-only queries and updates. XML nodes and documents are the fundamental unit of (logical) storage, just as a relational database has fields and rows. One important caveat to this is that native XML databases need more disk space to store both data and indexes than XML-enabled databases do. As the size of the native XML database grows, the storage needs grow almost exponentially.

The standard for querying XML data per W3C recommendation is XQuery; the latest version is XQuery 3.1. XQuery includes XPath as a sub-language and XML itself is a valid sub-syntax of XQuery. In addition to XPath, some XML databases support XSLT as a method of transforming documents or query results retrieved from the database.

=== Language features ===
Name	License	Native Language	XQuery 3.1	XQuery 3.0	XQuery 1.0	XQuery Update	XQuery Full Text	EXPath Extensions	EXQuery Extensions	XSLT 2.0	XForms 1.1	XProc 1.0
BaseX	BSD	Java	Yes	Yes	Yes	Yes	Yes	Yes	Yes	Yes	Yes	No
eXist	GNU LGPL	Java	Partial	Partial	Yes	Proprietary	Proprietary	Yes	Yes	Yes	Yes	Yes
MarkLogic Server	Commercial	C++	No	Partial	Yes	Proprietary	Proprietary	No	No	Yes	Yes	No
OpenText xDB	Commercial	Java	Partial	Partial	Yes	Yes	Yes	No	No	No	No	No
Oracle Berkeley DB XML	Commercial	C/C++										
Qizx	Commercial	Java	No	No	Yes	Yes	Yes	No	No	Yes	No	No
Sedna	Apache License 2.0	C/C++										

=== Supported APIs ===
Name	XQJ	XML:DB	RESTful	RESTXQ	WebDAV
BaseX	Yes	Yes	Yes	Yes	Yes
eXist	Yes	Yes	Yes	Yes	Yes
MarkLogic Server	Yes	No	Yes	Yes	Yes
Qizx	No	No	Yes	No	No
Sedna	Yes	Yes	No	No	No
