= Canto (disambiguation) =

A canto is the principal form of division in a long poem.

Canto or cantos or variation, may also refer to:

== Places ==
- Canton Province, an older English name of Guangdong, in the South of China
  - Capital city of Canton Province, an older English name of Guangzhou, the provincial capital of Guangdong
  - Cantonese language
- Canto, alternative name of Cahto, California
- Port del Cantó, Catalonia, Spain; a mountain pass
- Monte Canto (English: Mount Canto), Lombardy, Italy; a mountain
- Canto Alto (English: High Canto), Lombardy, Italy; a mountain
- Canto River, Rio Grande do Norte, Brazil; a river

== People ==
Surnamed "Canto"

- Adan Canto (1981–2024), Mexican actor
- Alberto del Canto (1547–1608), Portuguese conquistador
- Alvaro Garcia Canto (born 1986), Spanish soccer player
- Blas Cantó (born 1991), Spanish singer
- Dean Canto (born 1980), Australian racing driver
- Estela Canto (1915–1994), Argentinian writer
- Félix González Canto (born 1968), Mexican politician
- Flávio Canto (born 1975), Brazilian athlete
- Gustavo Canto (born 1994), Argentine soccer player
- Ignacio Canto (born 1981), Spanish fencer
- Marilyne Canto (born 1963), French actress
- Miguel Canto (1948–2026), Mexican boxing champion
- Toni Cantó (born 1965), Spanish actor

Surnamed "Cantos"

- Matilde Cantos (1898–1987), Spanish feminist
- Martín de Andújar Cantos (1602–????), Spanish sculptor

== Music ==
- The highest vocal part, the air or melody, in a piece of choral music (also cantus)
- Canto-pop, Cantonese-language pop music
- Canto fermo, the melody forming the basis of a polyphonic composition
- Canto General (Theodorakis), 1974 composition by Mikis Theodorakis
- Canto nuevo, a Latin American folk music style
- Canto (Charles Lloyd album), 1996
- Canto (Soler album), 2009
- Canto (Los Super Seven album), 2001
- Canto 34, A song by Five Finger Death Punch from their album War Is The Answer
- Van Canto, a German metal band

== Other ==
- The Cantos, an epic poem by Ezra Pound
- Canto, the popular press division of the Cambridge University Press
- Canto (news aggregator), a terminal based feed reader
- Canto Software, a software company
- Canto (organization), 19th century Brazilian anti-slavery organizations
- Canto Collection, a series of paintings by Rob Mohlmann

== See also ==
- Italian name for a corner where two streets meet. e.g. Canto ai Quattro Leoni, in Florence
- Canto General, Pablo Neruda's tenth book of poems
- Bel canto (disambiguation)
- Yo Canto (disambiguation)
