= Item =

Item may refer to:

== Organizations ==
- Instituto del Tercer Mundo (ITeM), the Third World Institute
- ITEM club, an economic forecasting group based in the United Kingdom

== Newspapers ==
- The Item, an American independent, morning newspaper published in Sumter, South Carolina
- The Huntsville Item, an American seven-day morning daily newspaper published in Huntsville, Texas
- Picayune Item, an American five-day daily newspaper published in Picayune, Mississippi

== Music ==
- Item (EP), first release by the band Onetwo
- "Item", a 2023 song by Stray Kids from 5-Star

== Other uses ==
- Item (gaming), objects in a video game collected by the player character to increase the score or progress through the story
- Digital Item, the basic unit of transaction in the MPEG-21 framework
- Item number, musical performance in Indian cinema
- Item (TV series), a 2019 South Korean television series
- Gerald Item (1960–2019), Indonesian swimmer
- ITEM, a group in the light novel and anime franchise A Certain Magical Index
- Item, a locality in Bende, Nigeria
- Item, main documentary unit of Wikidata

== See also ==
- The Daily Item (disambiguation)
