= Axmedis =

AXMEDIS is a set of European Union digital content standards, initially created as a research project running from 2004 to 2008 partially supported by the European Commission under the Information Society Technologies (IST DG-INFSO) programme of the Sixth Framework Programme (FP6). It stands for "Automating Production of Cross Media Content for Multi-channel Distribution". Now it is distributed as a framework, and is still being maintained and improved. A large part of the framework is under open source licensing. The AXMEDIS framework includes a set of tools, models, test cases, documents, etc. supporting the production and distribution of cross media content.

== Summary ==
The AXMEDIS framework supports the whole content production 'food chain' for cross media content creation, aggregation, adaptation, repurposing, protection and multichannel distribution, with a strong focus on automation.

The market for digital content is rapidly changing. Users are becoming more interested in using more interactive and intelligent content, that example can:

- include/describe/package several kinds of media (audio, video, games, documents, etc.), reproducing in a single digital object the interactivity and much more powerful entertainment capabilities than DVDs;
- provide enhanced interactivity such as navigating and selecting content elements to be played, making queries into the content elements, reacting to user commands and changes, providing annotations, etc.;
- be exchanged and distributed among different devices/tools: PC, mobiles, smart-phones, STB/PVR, HDR, PDA, game station, etc.;
- be obtained from several different interoperable distribution channels based on Internet, P2P, wireless mobile, satellite and/or terrestrial networks, etc.;
- change content behaviour according to the context and/or to the user profiles, context, device capabilities, etc.;
- protect and manage the IPR, that means that the content format has to support some DRM model and that this support a set of business models, for example: renting, pay per play, subscription, advertising, etc.;
- be stored in media centres to be redistributed to other devices;
- present some autonomy of control, asking to the user to provide information and data;
- provide autonomous capabilities for example to create an electronic guide, to issues content usage licenses, ask at the user to provide content, etc.;
- be personally produced at home and/or shared in the network.

These new forms of content and content usages can be fully exploited for digital content distribution, and are opening paths for a larger set of new applications and markets beyond the limitations of the physical media. With AXMEDIS the combinations of digital content formats and digital distribution channels are creating new applications including: user content, shared content, IPTV, DVB, VOD, POD, WEBTV, etc., for PC, PDA, mobiles and STB/PVR. Recent distribution models have been enabled by a set of new technologies grounded on content formats, content processing and adaptation capabilities, content protection models and solutions, hardware capabilities, and new solutions for Digital Rights Management, DRM.

== Aims ==
According to the official AXMEDIS website the main aims are to:

- reduce the costs of cross media (Multi-media) production and distribution
- search for and integrate objects and components through a query support system
- manage and monitor distribution

These objectives are being pursued by integrating research results, algorithms and tools.

== Objects and their file format ==
An Axmedis object is an MPEG-21 multimedia object which can virtually contain any kind of multimedia resource, metadata and rights-related information supporting the MPEG-21 "Rights Expression Language" (REL).

AXMEDIS content format supports from simple files to complex collections of multimedia for a large range of applications, from business to business to personal and/or global scale production, protection and distribution, with and without DRM. AXMEDIS format and solution can be used:

- for describing and/or packing and may be protected any kind of digital content, with standard, custom and extended metadata;
- for cultural heritage valorisation and distribution, educational and infotainment content: lessons, coursewares;
- for content distribution: VOD, IPTV, WEBTV, etc.;
- for modelling content for PC, PDA, P2P, Kiosks and mobiles with interactive parts;
- as intelligent content having the possibility of defining the internal business model and actions on the content itself, dynamic modelling of content behaviour;
- as interchange content format, wrapping any kind of files, including SMIL, HTML, FLASH, MXF, etc., for safer audio/visual sharing;
- for sharing content among B2B actors of the value chain, in protected and non-protected versions;
- for leisure and entertainment content: video, TV, games, etc.;
- for distributing and protecting governmental, military, clinical information;
- for packaging, protecting and distributing newsML;
- for creating audio guides for PDA and mobiles: windows mobile and iPhone
- for producing content with advertising (customised and/or real time personalised advertising inside the package or linked to outside);
- for producing and delivering personalised content inside the package or linked to outside;
- for managing personally produced content from final users and customers;
- to provide multichannel experience and distribution: different content on different channels at the same time for multichannel experience of the user.

The above-mentioned scenarios and many others can be realised thanks to AXMEDIS technology and tools of: AXMEDIS content format, DRM, controlled P2P, and Content Processing.

== Main Tools ==
The AXMEDIS framework consists of a set of tools, accessible also in source code, plus documentation, test cases, specification, content for validation, workflow procedures, examples, grid rules, etc. Following is a (non exhaustive) overview of major tools. These tools enable the manual editing of AXMEDIS MPEG-21 objects, while the automated production can be performed by using AXCP tools. These tools are needed to play axmedis cross media objects (when they are in clean and/or protected). There are various flavours of the players for different devices for PC (standalone, browser plug-in, skinned), mobile, PDA, set top box.

- PC Windows XP and Vista players: capable of executing many video and audio formats and SMIL, HTML, MPEG-4, video, audio, documents, images, etc., and JavaScript methods. AXMEDIS PC player may provide different skin; Most of the AXMEDIS players can be customised in terms of GUI and functionalities. AXMEDIS Skin based player can be easily customised by a designer changing the graphical look and feel.
- Active X for IE player to integrate the player into WEB pages and other applications, for example .NET based; See the CrossMedia Finder of AXMEDIS as example.
- Plugin for Mozilla FireFox and other web browsers.
- PDA Windows Mobile 5 and 6 player, supporting: SMIL, HTML, MPEG-4, video, audio, documents, images, etc.;
- STB/PVR player based on (i) Linux, supporting audio visual, SMIL and HTML and on (ii) Kreatel STB;
- Pure java player for mobiles, supporting: MPEG-21, SMIL, images and audio visual;

=== Content Processing, AXCP ===
These tools are used for the automatic creation, aggregation, processing and distribution of multimedia content with the AXMEDIS format. This is done via scripts written in enhanced JavaScript. These tools include a JavaScript Integrated development environment (IDE), a scheduler and a GRID environment, and a visual designer for AXCP JS rules. AXMEDIS AXCP can be used to automate your content production, protection and distribution as stated above and in more details into the AXCP Technical Note. solution and tools is presently free of charge for any no profit institution. In addition, the full source code is provided to those institutions that are interested to join the development community of the AXCP. The AXCP offers functionalities to support and set up integrated activities of:

- content Ingestion and gathering, database management, crawling, indexing, archiving, gathering from OAI (see OAI-PMH), etc.;
- query, download and publication on social networks: YouTube, Flickr, XMF, mobile medicine;
- content storage and retrieval, active querying;
- content processing, repurposing, adaptation, transmoding, transcoding for text, docs, images, audio, video, multimedia, XML, SMIL, HTML, styles, MXF, newsML, MPEG-4, MPEG-21, etc.;
- metadata repurposing, adaptation, transcoding, integration, enrichment, validation;
- content descriptors, extraction and comparison, fingerprint, MPEG-7, MPEG-21, etc.;
- content composition, formatting, layout, styling;
- communication with databases, FTP, HTTP, P2P and distribution servers via several protocols;
- content packaging: MPEG-21, MXF, OMA, newsML, ZIP, etc.;
- content protection via several algorithms;
- content DRM with MPEG-21 and OMA, with tracking and reporting rights exploitation;
- content licensing, licensing the production of licenses;
- content publication and distribution toward multiple channels;
- workflow management integration with BizTalk and OpenFlow;
- user management: registration, licensing, profiling, advertising.

=== P2P: AXEPTool ===
The AXEPTool is a BitTorrent based legal P2P client for sharing AXMEDIS content. AXMEDIS P2P Controlled Network, for content distribution via P2P. It utilises BitTorrent Technology with query support and cataloguing servers, for protected or non-protected content. It has capabilities of automating content publication, controlling P2P network, and extracting statistical data and reports. The AXMEDIS P2P solution allows to control the network by means of control nodes that can be geographically distributed.

=== DRM, MPEG-21 DRM ===
AXMEDIS DRM which adopts MPEG-21 DRM, including servers and licensing tools and allowing DRM, detection of attacks, black list management, collection of actions logs containing traces about the rights exploitation, tools for administrative management, etc.

=== Cross Media Finder ===
AXMEDIS Cross Media Finder: an integrated portal for demonstrating AXMEDIS content and distribution: A Mobile Medicine Social network has been developed on this basis.

=== Object finders for mobile devices ===
They are a set of tools developed by DISIT lab to acquire and collect AXMEDIS content on mobile devices. AXMEDIS Object Finder is available for iPhone/iPod/iPad and Windows Mobile devices. They van be obtained from the Mobile Medicine portal. See also ECLAP collected library for performing arts and best practice network see http://www.eclap.eu, APREToscana agency for promoting tuscany research into European commission projects, facilitating the partner matching see http://www.apretoscana.org, IUF.CSAVRI.org a portal to support formation and training of new teams under preincubation, startups and spin-off at the University of Florence incubator.

== Consortium ==
The AXMEDIS project gathers many partners consisting of leading European digital content producers, integrators, archives, distributors and researchers.

== Conferences and workshops ==
Since 2005, the AXMEDIS consortium has been organising international conferences about cross-media and digital-media content production, processing, management, standards, representation, sharing, protection and rights management interoperability. AXMEDIS framework is continuously maintained and distributed, this news is from the February 2010. DISIT lab has produced compatible players with the AXMEDIS framework for iPhone and iPad (updated in August 2010).
