= ANPA =

ANPA may refer to:

- Atrial natriuretic peptide receptor
- American Native Press Archives, held at the Sequoyah Research Center
- American Neuropsychiatric Association
- American Newspaper Publishers Association
  - ANPA-1312, text markup specification used by the above newspaper
- Association of National Park Authorities
