= IPTC 7901 =

IPTC 7901 is a news service text markup specification published by the International Press Telecommunications Council that was designed to standardize the content and structure of text news articles. It was formally approved in 1979, and is still the world's most common way of transmitting news articles to newspapers, web sites and broadcasters from news services.

Using fixed metadata fields and a series of control and other special characters, IPTC 7901 was designed to feed text stories to both teleprinters and computer-based news editing systems. Stories can be assigned to broad categories (such as sports or culture) and be given a higher or lower priority based upon importance.

Although superseded in the early 1990s by IPTC Information Interchange Model and later by the XML-based News Industry Text Format, 7901's huge existing user base has persisted.

IPTC 7901 is closely related to ANPA-1312 (also known as ANPA 84-2 and later 89-3) of the Newspaper Association of America.

== C0 control codes ==
The standard replaces several of the ASCII control codes:

Seq	Dec	Hex	Replaced	Abbrev	Name	Description
^I	09	09	HT	FO	Formatting	Used in tabular data to move to the next tabulation position (retaining "Tab" semantics in this regard), and in standard formats to denote the next phase. The current IPTC specification instead recommends using regular ASCII C0 controls, and using the US control as a column break in tables.
^K	11	0B	VT	ECD	End of Instruction	Delimits the end of a typographical instruction intended for the typesetting device.
^L	12	0C	FF	SCD	Start of Instruction	Delimits the start of a typographical instruction intended for the typesetting device.
^M	13	0D	CR	QL	Quad Left	Terminates a line, indicating that it should be left-aligned. The current IPTC specification instead recommends using regular ASCII C0 controls, and representing this function with the < CR LF sequence.
^Q	17	11	DC1	FT1	Font One	Switches to regular typeface, i.e. disables bold or italic.
^R	18	12	DC2	FT2	Font Two	Switches to italic typeface.
^S	19	13	DC3	FT3	Font Three	Switches to bold typeface.
^W	23	17	ETX	?	End of paragraph	
^X	24	18	CAN	KW	Kill Word	Deletes the preceding word (deletes back to and including the last space, or back to and excluding the previous line break, whichever it encounters first). Retains "Cancel" semantics in this respect, but has a more specific function.
^Y	25	19	EM	EMSP	Em space	For indenting the first line of a paragraph
^\	28	1C	FS	SS	Super Shift	Non-locking shift code.
^\	28	1C	FS	?	?	"Central Field Separator" in tables
^]	29	1D	GS	QC	Quad Centre	Terminates a line, indicating that it should be centred.
^]	29	1D	GS	?	?	Mark following space as non-breaking
^^	30	1E	RS	QR	Quad Right	Terminates a line, indicating that it should be right-aligned.
^^	30	1E	RS	?	?	Mark following hyphen-minus as a soft hyphen
^_	31	1F	US	JY	Justify	Terminates a line which is to be justified.
