= Metadata Working Group =

- Abbreviation: MWG
- Formation: 2007; 19 years ago
- Type: Standards Organization
- Purpose: Preservation and seamless interoperability of digital image metadata Interoperability and availability to all applications, devices, and services
- Location: San Jose, California, U.S.
- Region served: Worldwide
- Parent organization: Internet Society
- Website: metadataworkinggroup.com

The Metadata Working Group was formed in 2007 by Adobe Systems, Apple, Canon, Microsoft and Nokia. Sony joined later in 2008. Microsoft proposed the idea in 2006.

The focus of the group is to advance the interoperability of metadata stored in digital media. Its specification, Guidelines for Handling Image Metadata, defined the interoperability among Exif, IIM (old IPTC), and XMP with consumer digital images. The following properties were selected for interoperability:

- keywords
- description
- date and time
- orientation
- rating
- copyright
- creator
- location created
- location shown

Test files for verification were added in 2008 and are available for download.
