= ANPA-1312 =

News agency text markup specification

ANPA-1312 is a 7-bit text markup specification for news agency use. It standardizes the content and structure of text news articles. It was created by (and named after) the former American Newspaper Publishers Association (ANPA) (1887–1992), one of the predecessors of the News Media Alliance, a trade association of American newspapers.

The specification was last modified in 1989 and as of the 2010s was still a common method of transmitting news to newspapers, websites and broadcasters from news agencies in North and South America. Although the specification provides for 1200 bit-per-second transmission speeds, modern transmission technology removes any speed limitations.

Using fixed metadata fields and a series of control and other special characters, ANPA-1312 was designed to feed text stories to both teleprinters and computer-based news editing systems.

Although the specification was based upon the 7-bit ASCII character set, some characters were declared to be replaced by traditional newspaper characters, e.g. small fractions and typesetting code. As such, it was a bridge between older typesetting methods, newspaper traditions and newer technology.

Perhaps the best known part of ANPA-1312 was the category code system, which allowed articles to be categorized by a single letter. For example, sports articles were assigned category S, and articles about politics were assigned P. Many newspapers found the system convenient and sorted both incoming news agency and staff articles by ANPA-1312 categories.

Although ANPA-1312 was superseded in the early 1990s by IPTC Information Interchange Model and later by the XML-based News Industry Text Format, its popularity in North America remained strong due, in part, to its widespread support by The Associated Press and the reluctance of newspapers to invest in new computers or software modifications. The Associated Press retired ANPA as a delivery option in 2023.

A modified version — but with the same name — was implemented by several news agencies after the vendor of some early computer systems modified the specification for its own purposes.

An international standard, IPTC 7901, is widely used in Europe and is closely related to ANPA-1312.

== C0 control codes ==
The ASCII control characters were modified/replaced in this format.

Seq	Dec	Hex	Replaced	Abbrev	Name	Description
^I	09	09	HT	FO	Formatting	Used in tabular data to move to the next tabulation position (retaining "Tab" semantics in this regard), and in standard formats to denote the next phase. The current IPTC specification instead recommends using regular ASCII C0 controls, and using the US control as a column break in tables.
^K	11	0B	VT	ECD	End of Instruction	Delimits the end of a typographical instruction intended for the typesetting device.
^L	12	0C	FF	SCD	Start of Instruction	Delimits the start of a typographical instruction intended for the typesetting device.
^M	13	0D	CR	QL	Quad Left	Terminates a line, indicating that it should be left-aligned. The current IPTC specification instead recommends using the < CR LF sequence.
^N	14	0E	SO	UR	Upper Rail	Starts an emphasised region of text. Used in Scandinavian journalistic text transmission as of 1975; IPTC recommendations as of 1976 used FT2 and FT3 instead. The current IPTC specification instead recommends using regular ASCII C0 controls, and marking up this function with the ^ character.
^O	15	0F	SI	LR	Lower Rail	Ends an emphasised region of text. Used in Scandinavian journalistic text transmission as of 1975; IPTC recommendations as of 1976 used FT1 instead marking up this function with the @ character.
^X	24	18	CAN	KW	Kill Word	Deletes the preceding word (deletes back to and including the last space, or back to and excluding the previous line break, whichever it encounters first). Retains "Cancel" semantics in this respect, but has a more specific function.
^\	28	1C	FS	SS	Super Shift	Non-locking shift code.
^]	29	1D	GS	QC	Quad Centre	Terminates a line, indicating that it should be centred.
^^	30	1E	RS	QR	Quad Right	Terminates a line, indicating that it should be right-aligned.
^_	31	1F	US	JY	Justify	Terminates a line which is to be justified.
