= ExifTool =

Software

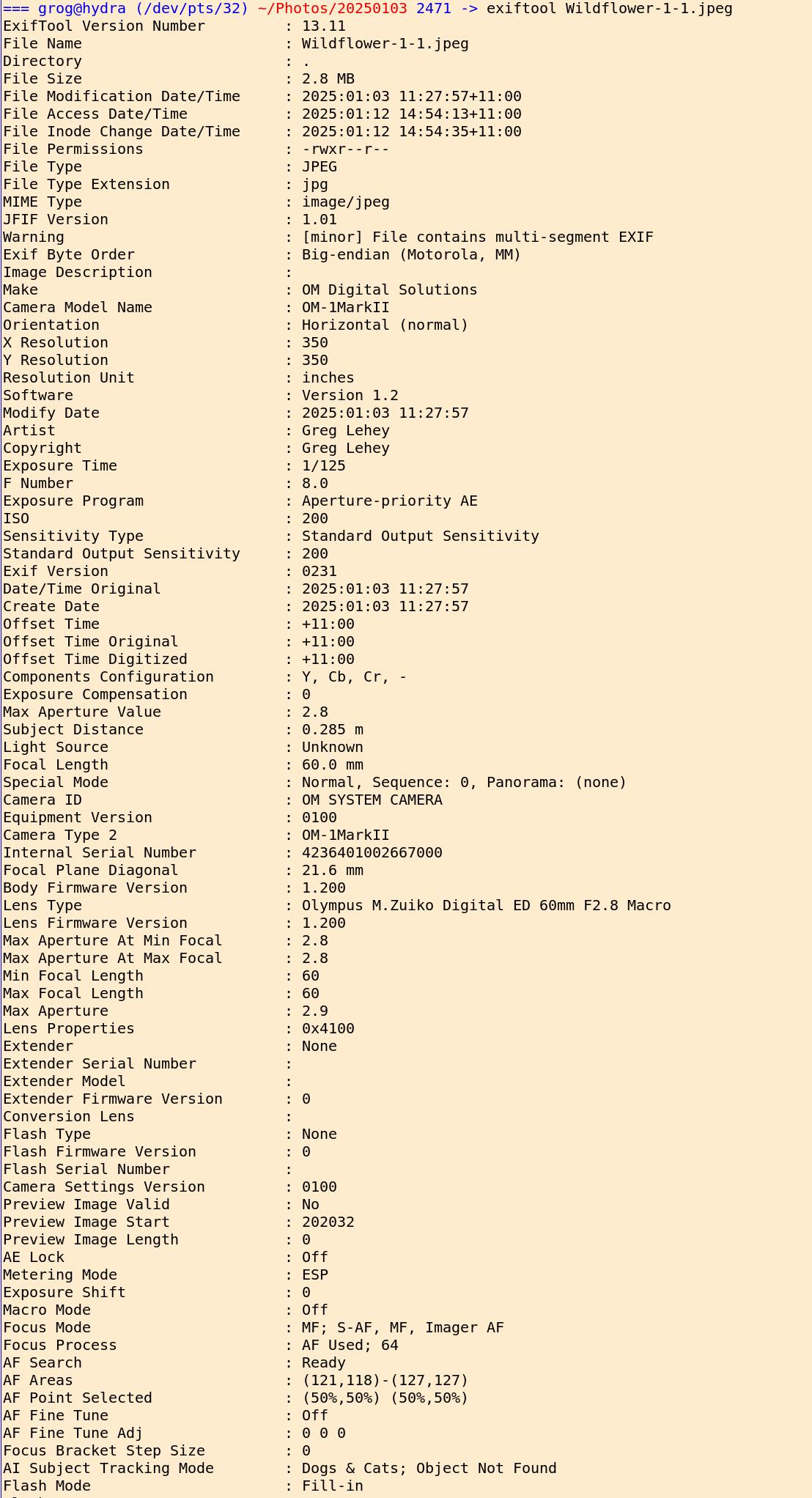
- Original author: Phil Harvey
- Release: 19 November 2003 (22 years ago)
- Stable release: 13.59 / 27 May 2026; 3 months ago
- Written in: Perl
- Operating system: Linux, macOS, Windows
- Type: Tag editor
- License: GPLv1+ or Artistic License
- Website: exiftool.org
- Repository: github.com/exiftool/exiftool

Meta Information Encapsulation
- Filename extension: .mie
- Internet media type: application/x-mie
- Magic number: 7e 10 04 xx 30 4d 49 45; 7e 18 04 xx 30 4d 49 45
- Developed by: Phil Harvey
- Initial release: 28 November 2005 (20 years ago)
- Latest release: 1.1; 21 January 2007
- Type of format: Metadata
- Container for: any other file format
- Website: exiftool.org/TagNames/MIE.html

ExifTool is a free and open source software program for reading, writing, and manipulating image, audio, video, and PDF metadata. As such, ExifTool classes as a tag editor. ExifTool can also be used as a metadata removal tool for supported file types, except for PDF, as old metadata is never actually deleted. (However, after running ExifTool the old metadata may be removed permanently using the "qpdf" utility) It is platform independent, available as both a Perl library (Image::ExifTool) and a command-line application.

ExifTool supports many types of metadata including Exif, IPTC, XMP, JFIF, GeoTIFF, ICC Profile, Photoshop IRB, FlashPix, AFCP and ID3, as well as the manufacturer-specific metadata formats of many digital cameras.

ExifTool is incorporated into different types of digital workflows, and is often used in digital forensic analysis and library archival. It is recommended over online Exif sites when dealing with more sensitive tasks since it can be run locally. Another common use is removing sensitive metadata, like location data, from photos. The tool, as of 2021, is widely-used.

== Metainformation encapsulation ==
ExifTool also implements its own open metadata format. It is designed to encapsulate metainformation from many sources, in binary or textual form, and bundle it together with any type of file. It can either be a single file, wrapping existing data, added as a trailer on other file types, or used as a sidecar file, carrying for example Exif or XMP metadata.

== See also ==
- libsndfile – sndfile-info displays audio file info
