= Howard Finberg =

Retired newspaper executive

Howard Finberg is a retired US newspaper executive, educator, and consultant.

He led the creation of some of the earliest news portals on the internet, and is the creator of News University, an online education portal for journalists which currently claims 410,000 registered users. News University was created under the auspices of the Poynter Institute for Media Studies, a journalism think-tank and training center where Finberg has served in several roles since 2002.

== Personal life ==
Finberg was born on July 24, 1949. He is the son of Martin Finberg and Flora Finberg (née Lerner). His brother Kenneth Finberg is a photographer and painter.

Finberg graduated from San Francisco State University.

== Early career and digital journalism leadership ==
Finberg's career began as a copy editor at the San Francisco Examiner. In 1987, he became an assistant managing editor with Phoenix Newspapers Inc., which published the Arizona Republic. Finberg went on to hold positions including art director and managing editor at the Republic.

In 1994, Finberg was named Senior Editor for Information Technology for the Republic and its sister newspaper, the Phoenix Gazette. Finberg led the creation of Arizona Central, an early online news portal. The site is now owned by USA Today.

By 1998, Finberg was Director of Information Technology for Central Newspapers Inc., by then the Republic's parent company.

By 2000, Finberg was Vice President of CNI Ventures, the investment unit of Central Newspapers. CNI invested in efforts to develop technology for e-ink newspapers.

Finberg has also held management positions at the San Francisco Chronicle and the Chicago Tribune, where he established the graphics desk. He has also worked at the San Jose Mercury News and the New York Times.

Finberg was the founding president of the Society for News Design Foundation.

== Poynter Institute and News University ==
Finberg first joined the Poynter Institute as its Presidential Scholar in 2002, tasked with examining technology's impact on media. He joined Poynter full-time in 2003 and stayed in various roles through 2014.

As Poynter's Director of Interactive Learning, and supported by a five-year grant by the Knight Foundation, Finberg led the creation of the online journalism training portal News University. News University debuted in April 2005 with just 10 courses and 3,000 users. The site grew to 200,000 registered users in 2011, when it had more than 275 courses.

While the departments that used it generally felt that Journalism 101 filled a useful role, the idea of outsourcing course content to a third party generated controversy on some campuses where it was used. Participating universities dropped out within a year, and by 2013 Journalism 101 was on hiatus. Commenting on the program's stall, Finberg speculated that “we got ahead of the audiences” for online college courses.

News U now claims 410,000 registered users, and offers more than 400 courses in 7 languages.

In 2012, Finberg became Poynter's Director of Partnerships and Alliances.

Finberg retired from Poynter in December 2014, but remained a consulting affiliate.

== Honors and recognition ==
In 2000, Finberg was named a “New Media Pioneer” by the Newspaper Association of America (now the News Media Alliance).

In 2015, the Poynter Institute created the Finberg Interactive Learning Fellowship. The fellowship supports a recent college graduate who works to support Poynter's online learning efforts.
