= MWG =

MWG may refer to:

- Milky Way, the "Milky Way Galaxy"
- Metadata Working Group, a company consortium to advance the interoperability of metadata stored in digital media
- Manhattan Waterfront Greenway
- Military World Games
- meters, water gauge (m wg)
