= \nnn =

\nnn may refer to:

- \NNN (octal), representation of literals (such as characters) as octal numbers 1 to 3 digits (common)
- \nnn (decimal), representation of characters as decimal numbers (rare)
- TIO code, trigraph representation of characters as decimal numbers in Hewlett-Packard palmtops

== See also ==
- \n
- nnn (disambiguation)
- \xnn (hexadecimal)
