= NITF =

NITF may refer to:

- National Imagery Transmission Format
- News Industry Text Format
