= Bel canto (disambiguation) =

Bel canto is an opera term that literally means "beautiful singing".

Bel Canto may also refer to:

- Bel Canto (novel), a novel by Ann Patchett
  - Bel canto (opera), a 2015 opera by Jimmy López, based on Patchett's novel
  - Bel Canto (film), a 2018 hostage drama film based on Patchett's novel
- Bel Canto (band), a Norwegian pop/electronica band
- Bel Canto (restaurant), a restaurant chain
