= Cumulus (software) =

Digital asset management software

- Developer: Canto Software
- Release: 1992; 34 years ago
- Stable release: 11.1.4 / May 2019; 7 years ago
- Platform: macOS, Windows, Linux
- Type: Digital asset management
- Website: www.canto.com

Cumulus is a digital asset management software designed for client/server system which is developed by Canto Software. The product makes use of metadata for indexing, organizing, and searching.

== History ==
Cumulus was first released as a Macintosh application in 1992, and was named by Apple Computer as the "Most Innovative Product of 1992". Cumulus introduced search capabilities beyond those available in the Macintosh at the time, particularly relating to thumbnails.

Cumulus 1.0 was a single-user product with no network capabilities. Among the main features of Cumulus 1.0, the search function automatically generated previews and contained support for the included AppleTalk – Peer-to-Peer – network.

Cumulus 2.5 was available in five different languages and received the 1993 MacUser magazine Eddy award for "Best Publishing & Graphics Utility". In 1995, Canto introduced the scanner software "Cirrus" to focus on the development of Cumulus.

Cumulus 3, released in 1996, introduced a server version for the first time and contained the possibility to spread files over the Internet via the "Web Publisher". Since Apple offered Cumulus 3 with its "Workgroup Server" as a bundle, Cumulus became one of the leading digital asset management systems.

Cumulus 4 was the first version that was network-ready, and was available for Macintosh, Windows and UNIX operating systems allowing for cross-platform file sharing. Released in 1998, the support of Solaris was discounted later.

Cumulus 5 modified the software core to use an open architecture providing an API to external systems and databases. The open architecture of Cumulus 5 also enabled a more functional bridge between Cumulus and the Internet.

Cumulus 6 introduced Embedded Java Plugin (EJP) which allowed system integrators to build custom Java plug-ins in order to extend the functionality of the Cumulus client.

Cumulus 6.5 marked the end of the Cumulus Single User Edition product, which was licensed to MediaDex for further development and distribution.

Cumulus 7 was introduced summer of 2006.

Cumulus 8 was released in June 2009, with new indexing capabilities taking advantage of multicore/multiprocessor systems, and ability to manage a wider variety of file formats.

Cumulus 8.5 was released in May 2011. Support was added for multilingual metadata, sometimes referred to as "World Metadata." Cumulus Sites was updated to support metadata editing and file uploads.

Cumulus 8.6 was released in July 2012, and contains an updated user interface for the administration of Cumulus Sites and additional features for web-based administration of Cumulus. Other additions include features for collaboration links, multi-language support and automated version control.

Cumulus 9 was released in September 2013 and introduced a new Web Client User Interface and the Cumulus Video Cloud. The Cumulus Web Client UI was redesigned to provide users with a modern, easy-to-use interface to support and guide the user while addressing modern business needs. The Cumulus Video Cloud extends the Cumulus video handling capabilities to add conversion and global streaming. Cumulus 9 also saw the addition of upload collection links which allow external collaborators to drag and drop files directly into Cumulus without needing a Cumulus account.

Cumulus 9.1 was released in May 2014 and introduced the Adobe Drive Adapter for Cumulus which allows users to browse and search digital assets in Cumulus directly from Adobe work environments such as Photoshop, InDesign, Illustrator, Premier and other Adobe applications.

Cumulus 10 (Cumulus X) was released July 2015 and introduced two mobile-friendly products: the Cumulus app and Portals. The Cumulus app on iOS was designed to allow users to collaborate either on an iPhone or iPad. Portals is the read-only version of the Cumulus Web Client where users can work with assets that admins allow.

Cumulus 10.1 was introduced in January 2016 and included the InDesign Client integration where users can work with Adobe InDesign while accessing their assets from Cumulus.

Cumulus 10.2 was introduced in September 2016 and brought the Media Delivery Cloud using Amazon Web Services (AWS). It allows users to manage their media rendition in a single source and distribute media files globally across different channels and devices.

Cumulus 10.2.3 was released in February 2017 and came with a "crop and customize photos" feature for Portals and the Web Client.

== Product overview ==
The cataloging of the file via upload into the archive is where Cumulus transfers maximum information about the file from the metadata. For image or photo files, this is typically Exif and IPTC data. The metadata is mainly used to search the archive. The use of embargo data supports license management for copyrighted material.

The managed files can be cataloged and their usage can be set. The indexing is based on a predefined taxonomy, which is governed by the internal rules of the organization or by industry standards. You can specify whether files can only be used for specific purposes or only by certain groups of people. The production management system includes version management for files. Via the publication function, the files can be distributed directly via links or e-mails. It's also possible to access from the outside via the Cumulus Portals web interface, which allows a read access to released content from the catalog.

There are different variants, starting with the "Workgroup archive server" up to the "Enterprise Business Server" for large companies. Both server and client are extensible through a Java-based plug-in architecture. Since version 7.0, there is a web application based on Ajax with a separate user interface. For access to the Cumulus catalog on mobile, there has been an application for Apple devices based on iOS since 2010.

== Miscellaneous ==
In 2015, Cumulus developer Canto established the first Canto digital asset management (DAM) event. The event is held annually in Berlin. The Henry Stewart team has been hosting DAM conferences since 2006.

== See also ==
- Comparison of image viewers
