= Cantus (disambiguation) =

Cantus may refer to:

- Cantus, an activity organised by Flemish and Dutch and Baltic student organisations and fraternities
- Cantus (database), a database for Latin ecclesiastical chant
- Cantus (vocal ensemble), an eight-member a cappella ensemble in Minnesota
- Cantus firmus, a pre-existing melody forming the basis of a polyphonic composition
- Cantus Records of Madrid, Spain
- Cantus the Minstrel, a character from Fraggle Rock
- Cantus (or canto), also known as superius may refer to the uppermost voice in early music manuscripts
- Cantus Verkehrsgesellschaft, a railway company in Germany
- Cantus (software)
- Cantus in Memoriam Benjamin Britten, a composition by Arvo Pärt
- Cantus (Norwegian female choir)
- Cantus, a song by 'Faith and the Muse' from their 1996 album Annwyn, Beneath the Waves
- Hyundai Cantus, the name of the Hyundai Creta sport utility vehicle model in the Dominican Republic
