= Cogniview =

Computer software company

Cogniview LLC
- Type: Private
- Industry: Productivity applications
- Headquarters: Atlanta, Georgia, US
- Key people: CEO: Lior Weinstein
- Products: PDF2XL, CC PDF Converter, PDF
- Website: https://www.pdf2xl.com/about-us/

Cogniview is an international computer software company, focusing mainly on data conversion applications for the PC.

The company has released several free open source software products related to PDF, data conversion, and content licensing. Cogniview's flagship product is PDF2XL, an application for converting tabular data from PDF files into Excel.

Cogniview sells its products through distributors and online worldwide, in more than 70 countries.

== Company history ==
Cogniview was created as a start-up company in 2002 and focused on converting Mainframe reports to Excel and Databases with its Enterprise Reports Gateway (ERG) product line. In December 2005, Cogniview released PDF2XL, an application to convert PDF data to Excel, which quickly became the focus of its business.

== Zimbabwe conspiracy theory ==
In late March 2008, the opposition in Zimbabwe accused Cogniview of helping the government in rigging the parliamentary and presidential elections. The accusations were later refuted by Cogniview's CEO Yoav Ezer in his blog, after online and offline newspapers caught on the story and started to investigate.

== Free open source software ==
Cogniview Labs have released the following software as free and open source software. All are licensed under GPL:

- CC Info – A plugin for Adobe Acrobat that allows integrating Creative-commons license information into created PDF files.
- CC PDF Converter – A virtual printer that creates PDF files from any Windows application (that supports printing), optionally embedding a Creative Commons license in it.
- Excel to PDF Converter – A virtual printer that has the same basic functionality as CC PDF Converterand integrates directly with Microsoft Excel to allow creating PDF files from Excel while keeping the web hyperlinks and internal links.
- PostWisdom for Firefox – A Firefox plugin for bloggers containing tips and information

== Commercial products ==
- PDF2XL – A program for conversion of tabular data from PDF files to Microsoft Excel, Word, Powerpoint, and OpenOffice Spreadsheet. The program has several editions:
  - PDF2XL – Allows converting from regular PDF files.
  - PDF2XL OCR – Includes an OCR component to allow converting from scanned PDF files in addition to the regular PDF files.
  - PDF2XL Enterprise – Includes a virtual printer to allow converting from any Windows application that allows printing to Excel, in addition to multiple types of PDF files.
  - PDF2XL CLI – Allows automation of PDF to Excel conversion via command line scripts.
- EUDI (Discontinued) – A product for converting tabular data from any Windows printing application into Excel.
- ERG Products (Discontinued) – A client/server solution for conversion of mainframe reports to Excel, Database, or XML.

== See also ==
- Portable Document Format
- Microsoft Excel
