= Libsndfile =

C library for reading and writing audio files

libsndfile
- Developer: Erik de Castro Lopo
- Stable release: 1.2.2 / 13 August 2023; 2 years ago
- Written in: C
- Operating system: Cross-platform
- Type: Sound library
- License: LGPL-2.1-or-later
- Website: libsndfile.github.io/libsndfile/
- Repository: github.com/erikd/libsndfile

libsndfile is a widely used C library written by Erik de Castro Lopo for reading and writing audio files. It supports a wide variety of audio file formats and will convert automatically from one to another. It allows the programmer to ignore many details, such as endianness.

In addition to the library itself, the package provides command-line programs for converting one format to another (sndfile-convert), for playing audio files (sndfile-play), and for obtaining information about the contents of an audio file (sndfile-info).

libsndfile is available for AmigaOS, Unix-like systems, including Linux and Mac OS X, and for Microsoft Windows. It is licensed under LGPL-2.1-or-later.

libsndfile is used, for example, by audio-editing software such as Audacity and Adobe Audition and the MP3 encoder LAME.

== See also ==
- AIFF
- ExifTool – utility for managing the metadata in bitmap and audio files and also PDF files
- Pulse-code modulation
- WAV
