= NNN =

NNN may refer to:

== Arts and entertainment ==
- Neal 'n' Nikki, a 2005 Indian movie directed by Arjun Sablok and starring Uday Chopra and Tanisha
- NNN, the production code for the 1972 Doctor Who serial The Mutants

== Companies and organizations ==
- National Numeracy Network (NNN), a professional organization that promotes numeracy in the United States
- NNN Reit, a real estate investment trust in the United States
- Norsk Naerings- og Nytelsesmiddelarbeiderforbund, the Norwegian Union of Food, Beverage and Allied Workers

=== News ===
- NAM News Network, a news network set up by non-aligned countries
- Newspaper National Network, a marketing partnership of the top 25 newspaper companies in America and the Newspaper Association of America
- Nippon News Network, the Japanese television news network
- Norddeutsche Neueste Nachrichten, a German newspaper
- Nine News Now, an Australian news bulletin
- National Nine Network, former name of the Nine Network
- National Nine News, former name of Nine News

== People ==
- Naomi Nari Nam, an American figure skater often referred to by her initials
- Netumbo Nandi-Ndaitwah, the president of Namibia

== Other uses ==
- N-Nitrosonornicotine, a nitrosamine carcinogen found in tobacco
- New Nordic Norm, a type of binding for cross-country (Nordic) skis
- nnn (file manager), a free text-based file manager for Unix-like systems
- NNN Lease (triple net lease), a lease agreement in which the renter is responsible for paying property taxes, insurance, and maintenance charges
- No Nut November, an Internet challenge
- The "Disconnect" command code in Telex usage; by extension, "stop" in other uses
