= Newspaper National Network =

Defunct American marketing network for national newspapers

- Abbreviation: NNN
- Formation: 1994
- Dissolved: June 30, 2016
- Legal status: LP closed
- Purpose: Marketing network for newspaper advertising
- Location: New York City, United States
- Members: Top 25 Newspapers in the United States
- President: Jason E. Klein
- Website: http://www.nnnlp.com/ at the Wayback Machine (archived July 14, 2011)

The Newspaper National Network (NNN) was an American marketing partnership of the top 25 newspaper companies in the United States and the Newspaper Association of America. NNN provided major advertisers with planning and placement support across over 9,000 newspapers for print and online. The group was headquartered in New York City. The network was closed in June 2016.

== History ==
NNN was formed in 1994 by a cross-industry effort to reverse a long-term decline in national advertising in newspapers. Former New York City School Chancellor Cathie Black was instrumental in NNN's inception.

After careful study, the leading newspaper companies in America and the Newspaper Association of America financed the creation and launch of NNN. NNN was initially targeted on a highly selective set of advertiser categories, which did virtually no advertising in newspapers. Its scope expanded, and since 1994 NNN has placed over $2 billion in newspaper advertising campaigns.

NNN's shareholder companies owned most all major market newspapers, including the New York Times, Los Angeles Times, and Washington Post. NNN's is focused on 16 vertical categories of advertising where newspapers receive less than 10% of total media spending. In 2003, the NNN shareholder partners collectively reaffirmed their support of NNN by adopting a new mission and operating principles.

NNN ceased operations on June 30, 2016. At the time, it had a reported $1 million in losses.
