= Yo Canto =

Yo Canto may refer to:

- Yo canto (Julio Iglesias album), a 1969 album by Spanish singer Julio Iglesias
- Io canto, a 2006 album by Italian singer Laura Pausini
- Yo Canto (TV series), a 2011 reality show/singing competition from Puerto Rico
