= CC PDF Converter =

- Developer: Cogniview
- Stable release: 0.9.0.0 / November 18, 2012; 13 years ago
- Written in: C++
- Operating system: Microsoft Windows
- Available in: English
- Type: PDF generator
- License: GNU GPL

CC PDF Converter was a free and open-source program that allowed users to convert documents into PDF files on Microsoft Windows operating systems, while embedding a Creative Commons license. The application leveraged RedMon and Ghostscript and was licensed under the GNU GPL.

A 2013 review in PC World gave the software 4 out of 5 stars.

CC PDF Converter included Razoss Bar (RazossInstaller_cogniview.exe), a closed source toolbar that is installed by default (tested version 0.9.0.0).

CC PDF Converter is no longer available from the original developer (Cogniview).

In 2018, the U.S. Department of Veterans Affairs designated the software as divest. Since January 2019, the VA designation has been unapproved.

== See also ==
- Ghostscript
- List of PDF software
- List of virtual printer software
