= Digital Item =

Digital Item is the basic unit of transaction in the MPEG-21 framework. It is a structured digital object, including a standard representation, identification and metadata.

A Digital Item may be a combination of resources like videos, audio tracks or images; metadata, such as descriptors and identifiers; and structure for describing the relationships between the resources.

It is becoming difficult for users of content to identify and interpret the different intellectual property rights that are associated with the elements of multimedia content. For this reason, new solutions are required for the access, delivery, management and protection of this content.

== Digital Item Declaration ==
MPEG-21 proposes to facilitate a wide range of actions involving Digital Items so there is a need for a very precise description for defining exactly what constitutes such an item.

A Digital Item Declaration (DID) is a document that specifies the makeup, structure and organisation of a Digital Item. The purpose of the Digital Item Declaration is to describe a set of abstract terms and concepts, to form a useful model for defining what a Digital Item is. Following this model, a Digital Item is the digital representation of an object, which is managed, described or exchanged within the model.

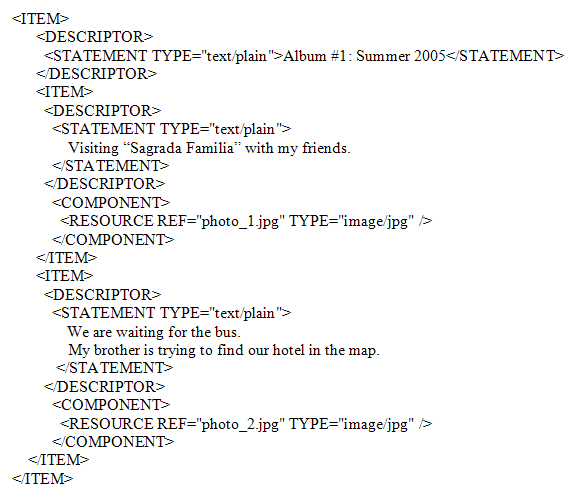

== Digital Item Identification ==
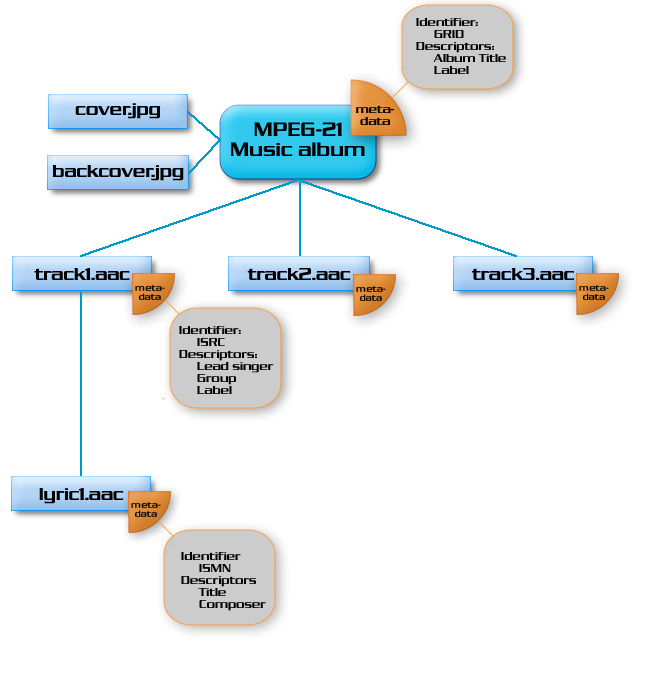
Visual example of a Digital Item

Digital Item Identification (DII) specification includes not only how to identify Digital Items uniquely but also to distinguish different types of them. These Identifiers are placed in a specific part of the Digital Item Declaration, which is the statement element, and they are associated with Digital Items.

Digital Items and their parts are identified by encapsulating uniform resource identifiers, which are a compact string of characters for identifying an abstract or physical resource.

The elements of a DID can have zero, one or more descriptors; each descriptor may contain a statement which can contain an identifier relating to the parent element of the statement. Besides the references to the resources, a DID can include information about the item or its parts. On the left, there is a visual example about the metadata that a music album could have in MPEG-21.

It is necessary for DII to allow differentiating between the different schemas that users can use to describe their content. MPEG-21 DII uses the XML mechanism to do this.

== Digital Item Adaptation ==
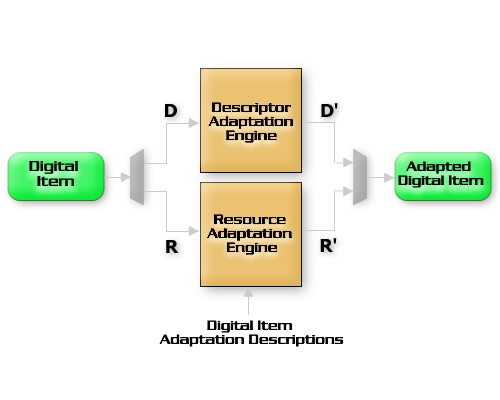
Schema of the Digital Item adaptation

Mainly, the key element is to achieve transparent access to distributed advanced multimedia content, by avoiding users from doing network and terminal installation, management and implementation. This will enable the provision of network and terminal resources on demand to form user communities where multimedia content can be created and shared, always with the agreed/contracted quality, reliability and flexibility.

Towards this objective the adaptation of Digital Items is required. As shown in the next conceptual schema, a Digital Item is subject to a descriptor adaptation engine, as well as a resource adaptation engine, which produce together the adapted Digital Item.

== File Format ==
At this point, we know that a Digital Item can be a complex collection of information. Both still and dynamic media can be included, for example: images and movies; as well as Digital Item information, metadata, layout information, and so on. It can also include both textual data, XML for instance, and binary data, like an MPEG-4 presentation or a still picture.

The MPEG-21 Part 9 specification (ISO/IEC 21000-9) defined the MPEG-21 File Format. It is based on the ISO base media file format and designed to contain a base MPEG-21 XML document with some or all of its ancillary resources, potentially in a single package. It uses filename extension .m21 or .mp21 and MIME type application/mp21.
