= The Daily Item =

The Daily Item is the name of the following American newspapers:

- The Daily Item (Clinton), Clinton, Massachusetts
- The Daily Item (Lynn), Lynn, Massachusetts
- The Wakefield Daily Item, Wakefield, Massachusetts
- The Daily Item (Port Chester), Port Chester, New York
- The Daily Item (Sunbury), Sunbury, Pennsylvania
- The Daily Item (Sumter), Sumter, South Carolina
