= Bel Canto (restaurant) =

Restaurant information
- Location: Paris, France

Bel Canto is a chain of restaurants, based in Paris, France, where singers perform live opera arias for the diners.

== Concept ==
Bel Canto employs opera singers as waiters and waitresses. The singers usually work in groups of four, and every 15 minutes a different opera aria is performed. As of 2008, Bel Canto employed 50 singers and 10 pianists. The restaurants are decorated in red and gold velvet, with musical instruments and opera costumes lining the walls.

== History ==
The first Bel Canto restaurant opened in Paris in 1999, and since then another restaurant opened in Paris, and a third in Neuilly-sur-Seine. After an unsuccessful attempt in La City, London, in 2008, Bel Canto London opened in Corus Grand Hotel Hyde Park in 2009.
