= DBGallery =

Digital asset management software

- Developers: GRR Systems, Inc.
- Release: 2007; 19 years ago
- Stable release: 19.5 / 26 June 2026; 2 months ago
- Type: Digital asset management
- License: Proprietary
- Website: dbgallery.com

DBGallery is digital asset management software that provides a shared repository for organizing, searching, and distributing images, videos, and documents. It is available as software as a service (SaaS) and for on-premises deployment.

== Features ==
DBGallery supports metadata-based searching, tagging, duplicate detection, and version control. Users can organize assets in folders and collections. Custom metadata fields allow organizations to define additional searchable information and configure where it appears in the interface.

Collaboration tools include configurable review and approval workflows, comments, annotations, and notifications when assets or workflow statuses change. Access permissions can be assigned to users and roles for individual folders and collections. External sharing links can have expiration dates and download restrictions. Audit trails record user and asset activity, including metadata changes, downloads, and access through sharing links.

Artificial intelligence features include object and face recognition, optical character recognition, generated image descriptions, and video transcription and scene descriptions.

== Deployment and integration ==
DBGallery provides a REST application programming interface (API) for searching, uploading and downloading assets, and adding metadata from other applications. Authentication options include single sign-on integration for hosted and on-premises installations. The developer states that the platform scales to support collections containing millions of assets and deployments serving thousands of users.

== History ==
Development began in 2005 as a client–server desktop application for image tagging, and the product became commercially available in 2007. By August 2013, DBGallery was offered as both an intranet system and a SaaS service.

Version 6.5 added custom metadata fields in 2014. Version 15, released in February 2025, introduced optical character recognition and AI-generated image descriptions.

In September 2026, DBGallery announced expanded AI metadata capabilities, including customizable description prompts, video transcription, and automated video scene descriptions.
