= Canto (organization) =

The cantos were guilds or associations managed by Nagos (Yoruba slaves) in Bahia, Brazil, in which members pooled resources to buy freedom, with the first to secure it contributing to the pool until the last canto member was free.

The term “canto” literally means corner. The cantos were called "corners" because of the places they gathered in the city to attend their customers. Each canto bore the name of the locale where its ganhadores (earners) gathered.

The cantos were well organized and had a system for electing their own captains. Brazilian historian Manuel Querino described the inauguration ceremony for the new captain:

The members of the canto would borrow a keg from one of the warehouses on Julião or Pilar Street. They would fill it with sea water, bind it with ropes, and stick a long board through the ropes. From eight to twelve Ethiopians, usually the strongest of the lot, would lift the keg, on top of which the new canto captain would ride, holding the branch of a bush in one hand and in the other a bottle of white rum.

The entire canto would parade toward the Pedreiras neighborhood. Porters would intone a monotonous air, in an African dialect or patois. They would return, in the same order, to the point of departure. The recently elected captain was then congratulated by members of other cantos, and on that occasion, he performed a sort of exorcism with the liquor bottle, sprinkling a few drops of its contents out.

This confirmed the election.
