= Xournal =

Open-source software for adding notes to PDF files

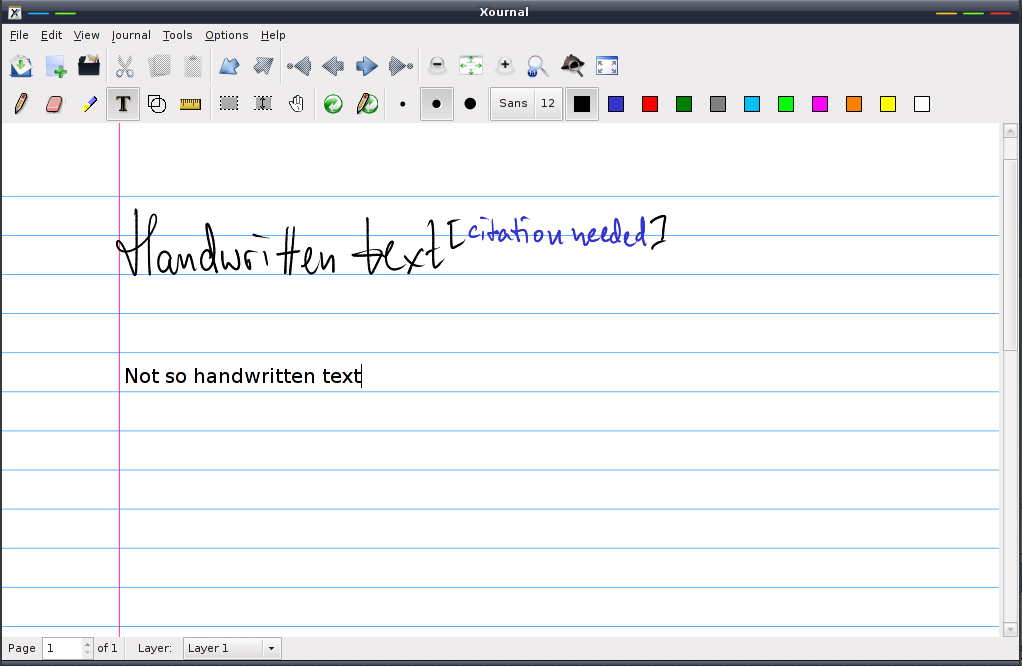
- Stable release: 0.4.8.2016 (July 20, 2017)
- Written in: C, C++
- Operating system: Linux, Unix-like, macOS, Windows
- License: GPL v2
- Website: Xournal++ github.com/xournalpp/xournalpp
- Repository: sourceforge.net/p/xournal/code/ci/master/tree/

Xournal is an open source tool for annotating PDF files. It supports pen, mouse, and keyboard input. It and the related Xournal++ are commonly used for adding annotations and electronic signatures to PDF files, especially on Linux desktops.

== PDF annotations ==
Users can open PDF files and use Xournal to highlight in color, type text, and draw diagrams. Xournal uses the Poppler program library to render the PDF files.

Annotations can be saved in the program's .xoj file format without modifying the original PDF file. Users can export a separate annotated PDF.

== Xournal++ ==
The related project Xournal++ uses the .xopp file extension. It started as a rewrite of Xournal in C++, but has since grown beyond the original. Xournal stopped adding new features in 2016, while Xournal++ remains under active development in 2025. Although Xournal++ is not formally considered the successor to Xournal, the original's author suggests users try Xournal++.

Note taking example in Xournal++

== See also ==
- Open-source software
- Open educational resources
- Smart Pen
- Handwriting recognition
- Windows Journal
