= Kodak EasyShare V570 =

Overview
- Maker: Kodak
- Type: Compact digital camera

Lens
- Lens: 39 mm to 117 mm (35 format equivalent) (5× zoom)

Sensor/medium
- Sensor: 1/2.5" CCD
- Maximum resolution: 2569 × 1929
- Storage media: MM card, SD card

The Kodak EasyShare V570 was a 5-megapixel digital camera manufactured by Eastman Kodak. Announced on January 2, 2006, it was an upper-end model in the consumer price range, advertised at $400 in the United States in January 2006. It had an innovative dual lens system, combining two periscopic groups each with its own sensor: one very wide angle equivalent to a 23 mm in 135 format and a 3X zoom equivalent to a 39–117 mm, totalizing a virtual 5X zoom, with a step between 23 and 39 mm. It is the first dual lens digital camera. The model won a gold medal in the 2006 Industrial Design Excellence Awards.

There were two other models in Kodak's line of dual lens cameras that were announced shortly after the introduction of the Easyshare V570: the Easyshare V610, which was announced on April 25, 2006 and the Easyshare V705, which was announced on August 8, 2006.

The Easyshare V610 was a 6-megapixel, Bluetooth-enabled, dual lens camera that forged the fixed focus 23 mm wide angle lens of the V570 and V705 for a 38-114mm lens. Unlike the V570, it did not include a dock.

The Easyshare V705 was a 7.1-megapixel camera that was offered in 3 body colors - black, silver, and pink. It also did not include a dock.

== Technical specifications ==
Image resolution
5.0 MP, 2569 × 1929 (CCD resolution 2690 × 1995)
format
JPEG/Exif v 2.21; 1.8, 3.1, 4.0, 4.4, 5.0 MP
Lens
Schneider Kreuznach lenses; retina dual lens technology: ultra wide-angle lens (23 mm equiv.) plus 3X optical zoom lens (up to 117 mm equiv. telephoto) system. Provided 5X optical zoom range 23 mm–fixed (35 mm equiv.) f/2.8 39–117 mm (35 mm equiv.) f/3.9–f/4.4
Focus range
ultrawide: 2.6 ft (0.8 m)–infinity; standard: 2 ft (0.6 m)–infinity; macro, wide: 2–2.3 ft (0.5–0.7 m), tele: 1–2.3 ft (0.30–0.7 m)
Auto focus
TTL-AF, multi-zone AF, center zone AF; control : single AF, continuous AF
Shutter speed
8–1/1448 sec, long exposure 0.5–8 sec
Sensitivity
ISO equivalent 64–160 (auto) and 64, 100, 200, 400, 800 (1.8MP) (manual)
Built-in flash
auto, off, fill, digital red-eye reduction, range ultrawide, ISO 200: 2.6–10.2 ft (0.8 m–3.1 m); wide, ISO 200: 2–7.2 ft (0.6–2.2 m); tele, ISO 200: 2–6.6 ft (0.6–2.0 m)
LCD
2.5 in. (6.35 cm) 230K pixels
Burst mode
2.3 frame/s, maximum 4 images
Shutter Delay
0.2 sec. (ultrawide lens/preview on), 0.3 sec. (3X zoom lens/preview on), shot to shot : 1.0 sec.
Video mode
VGA (640 × 480 pixels) at 30 frame/s, QVGA (320 × 240 pixels) at 30 frame/s up to 80 min. based on memory capacity continuous MPEG-4 compressed video with audio (QuickTime), 3X zoom during video
Storage
28 MB internal memory plus SD/MMC card expansion slot
interfaces
A/V output (NTSC or PAL, user-selectable), KODAK Camera Dock/Printer Dock interface, digital (USB 2.0) connector
Power
Rechargeable Lithium-Ion Digital Camera Battery KLIC-7001
Dimensions
W × H × D: 4 × 2 × .8 in. (101 × 49.8 × 20.4 mm); 4.5 oz (125 g)
