= PicaJet =

Digital photo organizer software

- Developer: PicaJet.com
- Initial release: 2004
- Operating system: Windows
- Type: Digital photo and Video organizer
- License: Freeware, commercial software
- Website: picajet.com

PicaJet is a digital photo organizer software. Photos, located in various places on hard drives, can be located by date, category (which can be defined), rating or other user-defined custom criterion. PicaJet can assign images to categories without limitations to category nesting levels.

While the program offers basic image-editing tools, it gives various ways to sort, file, and annotate photos, as well as some extras like free Flickr and Fotki plug-ins and a Send-to-Mobile feature.

== Network support ==
PicaJet supports networking. The photos can be accessed on multiple networked computers. Although multiple users can view the photos at once, only one user will be able to edit the database.

== Features ==
PicaJet can generates categories from folder names or IPTC keywords, import some IPTC tags like descriptions and categories. And the program can automatically creates an unsaved metadata folder for any images that have undergone changes to metadata information like descriptions or categories. This information can be reviewed before storing it to the embedded image IPTC/XMP file.

== See also ==
- Comparison of image viewers
- Desktop organizer
- List of photo sharing websites
