= News Industry Text Format =

XML specification

News Industry Text Format (NITF) is an XML specification designed to standardize the content and structure of individual text news articles.

== Usage ==
The NITF specification defines a standard way to mark up an article's content and structure, as well as a wide variety of metadata that different organizations may choose to use.

Additionally, multimedia can be associated with articles, although NITF does not allow for layout of multimedia within article text. Since NITF files are XML, they can be easily parsed, as well as transformed via XSLT to other formats.

The format is widely used across the news industry. Newspapers such as The New York Times, amongst others, news agencies such as Associated Press and Agence France-Presse, and archival services such as LexisNexis use NITF for inter-agency transmission of news as well as internal transmission and storage.

NITF complements NewsML-G2 — an IPTC XML format for bundling and transmitting news. NITF provided schema (XSD) files in addition to DTDs for validating NITF files.

== History ==
NITF was developed jointly by the International Press Telecommunications Council (IPTC) and the Newspaper Association of America, the two major standards organizations of the global and the US American news industry. It started out as a SGML specification prior to its XML incarnation.
