= MPEG-21 =

Digital rights management standard

The MPEG-21 standard, from the Moving Picture Experts Group, aims at defining an open framework for multimedia applications. MPEG-21 is ratified in the standards ISO/IEC 21000 - Multimedia framework (MPEG-21).

MPEG-21 is based on two essential concepts:

- definition of a Digital Item (a fundamental unit of distribution and transaction)
- users interacting with Digital Items

Digital Items can be considered the kernel of the Multimedia Framework and the users can be considered as who interacts with them inside the Multimedia Framework. At its most basic level, MPEG-21 provides a framework in which one user interacts with another one, and the object of that interaction is a Digital Item. Due to that, we could say that the main objective of the MPEG-21 is to define the technology needed to support users to exchange, access, consume, trade or manipulate Digital Items in an efficient and transparent way.

MPEG-21 Part 9: File Format defined the storage of an MPEG-21 Digital Item in a file format based on the ISO base media file format, with some or all of Digital Item's ancillary data (such as movies, images or other non-XML data) within the same file. It uses filename extensions .m21 or .mp21 and MIME type application/mp21. 30000

== Digital rights management ==
MPEG-21 defines also a "Rights Expression Language" standard as means of managing restrictions for digital content usage. As an XML-based standard, MPEG-21 is designed to communicate machine-readable license information and do so in a "ubiquitous, unambiguous and secure" manner.

Among the aspirations for this standard, that the industry hope will put an end to file sharing, is that it will constitute: "A normative open framework for multimedia delivery and consumption for use by all the players in the delivery and consumption chain. This open framework will provide content creators, producers, distributors and service providers with equal opportunities in the MPEG-21 enabled open market."

== See also ==
- Digital rights management
- Axmedis AXMEDIS are free MPEG-21 tools for authoring and play
