= News Media Alliance =

Trade association of newspapers in North America

- Formation: June 1, 1992; 34 years ago
- Headquarters: Arlington, Virginia
- Leader: Danielle Coffey (since 2023)
- Website: www.newsmediaalliance.org

The News Media Alliance (formerly known as the Newspaper Association of America (NAA) until 2016; stylized as News/Media Alliance) is a trade association representing approximately 2,000 news media organizations in the United States and in Canada. Member newspapers represented by the Alliance include large daily papers, non-daily and small-market publications, and digital and multiplatform products. The organization has organized and hosted mediaXchange, the newspaper industry's annual conference.

== Overview ==
Headquartered in Arlington, Virginia, just outside Washington, D.C., the News Media Alliance is a nonprofit that focuses on:

- Freedom of the press
- Public policy and legal matters
- Advertising growth

Among the association's top priorities are public policy and legal matters, as well as revenue and audience development for the broad range of products and digital platforms now offered by the newspaper industry.

== History ==
On June 1, 1992, seven newspaper-industry associations merged to create the Newspaper Association of America. The associations included the American Newspaper Publishers Association (founded in 1887), the Newspaper Advertising Bureau, the Association of Newspaper Classified Advertising Managers, the International Circulation Managers Association, the International Newspapers Advertising and Marketing Executives, the Newspaper Advertising Co-op Network, and the Newspaper Research Council.

By 1997, the NAA represented more than 1,600 newspapers in the U.S. and Canada.

In 2016, the Newspaper Association of America changed its name to the News Media Alliance. After this change the Alliance no longer required that members produce a printed paper, with the organization now also accepting digital news sites as members. However, all members must still produce original journalism.

In July 2017, the News Media Alliance announced they were trying to get a limited antitrust exemption from Congress, to let them negotiate collectively with internet companies. In June 2019, in an apparent effort to promote this bill, now named the "Journalism Competition and Preservation Act", it published a report estimating that in 2018, Google had made around $4.7 billion from news content. The NMA's head David Chavern argued that part of that sum should be shared with the news industry. As summarized by the Columbia Journalism Review, the accuracy of the NMA's claims was widely questioned, with "a number of prominent journalists and media-industry observers [scoffing] at both the number and the report itself". The Nieman Journalism Lab criticized the NMA's report as "based on math reasoning that would be embarrassing from a bright middle schooler".

In July 2022, the News Media Alliance and MPA – The Association of Magazine Media have merged to create the News/Media Alliance, "a nonprofit organization representing more than 2,000 news and magazine media organizations and their multiplatform businesses in the United States and globally."

The News Alliance hosted a Support Journalism to advocate for higher quality of publishing. This event was in conjunction with over 80 participating publishers from across the United States.

== Organization ==
The Alliance previously partnered with the Newspaper National Network (now closed), a print and online advertising sales partnership, and the NAA Foundation, which emphasizes youth readership and the cultivation of a more diverse media work force.

The Alliance is a member of the World Association of Newspapers and News Publishers, the World Press Freedom Committee and the International Press Telecommunications Council.

== See also ==
- Newspaper National Network
- National Press Club (United States)
- American Press Institute
- American Society of Journalists and Authors
- Society of Professional Journalists
