= Canto Collection =

Series of paintings

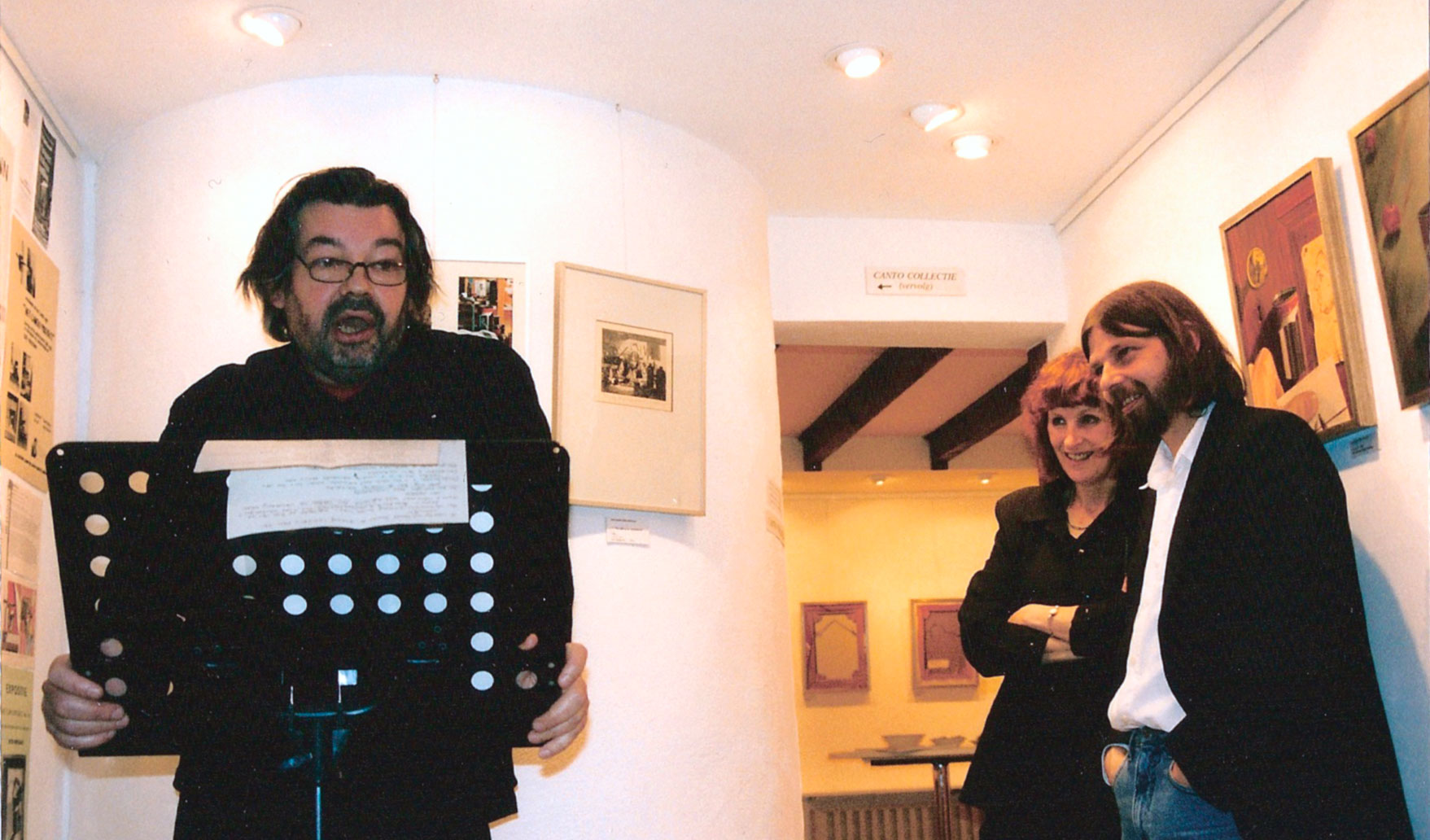
- Opening of permanent Canto Collectie in Museum Møhlmann (on the left Maarten van Rossem, on the right Rob and Laura Møhlmann)
- Artist: Rob Møhlmann
- Year: 1982
- Medium: oil on canvas, later panel
- Movement: Realism
- Dimensions: 40 cm × 30 cm (16 in × 12 in)
- Location: Museum Møhlmann, Appingedam

The Canto Collection (formerly known as the Canto Project) is a series of 124 equally sized paintings made by the painter Rob Møhlmann. He worked on the series from 1982 up to and including 1993. Each painting depicts, as its central topic, literally and figuratively, an everyday tin can of the non-existent brand, Canto. The Canto Collection has been on permanent display, since 2008, in Museum Møhlmann, Appingedam, the Netherlands.

== Preparation ==
A number of strict rules were adhered to during the set up stages:

1. Each painting is painted in the upright portrait-position and always has the same measurements (40x30cm)
2. The tin can (which is painted actual size) is always the same size on each painting.
3. In each work the tin can is located at exactly the same place in the image plane.
4. The can is always perceived from the same angle.

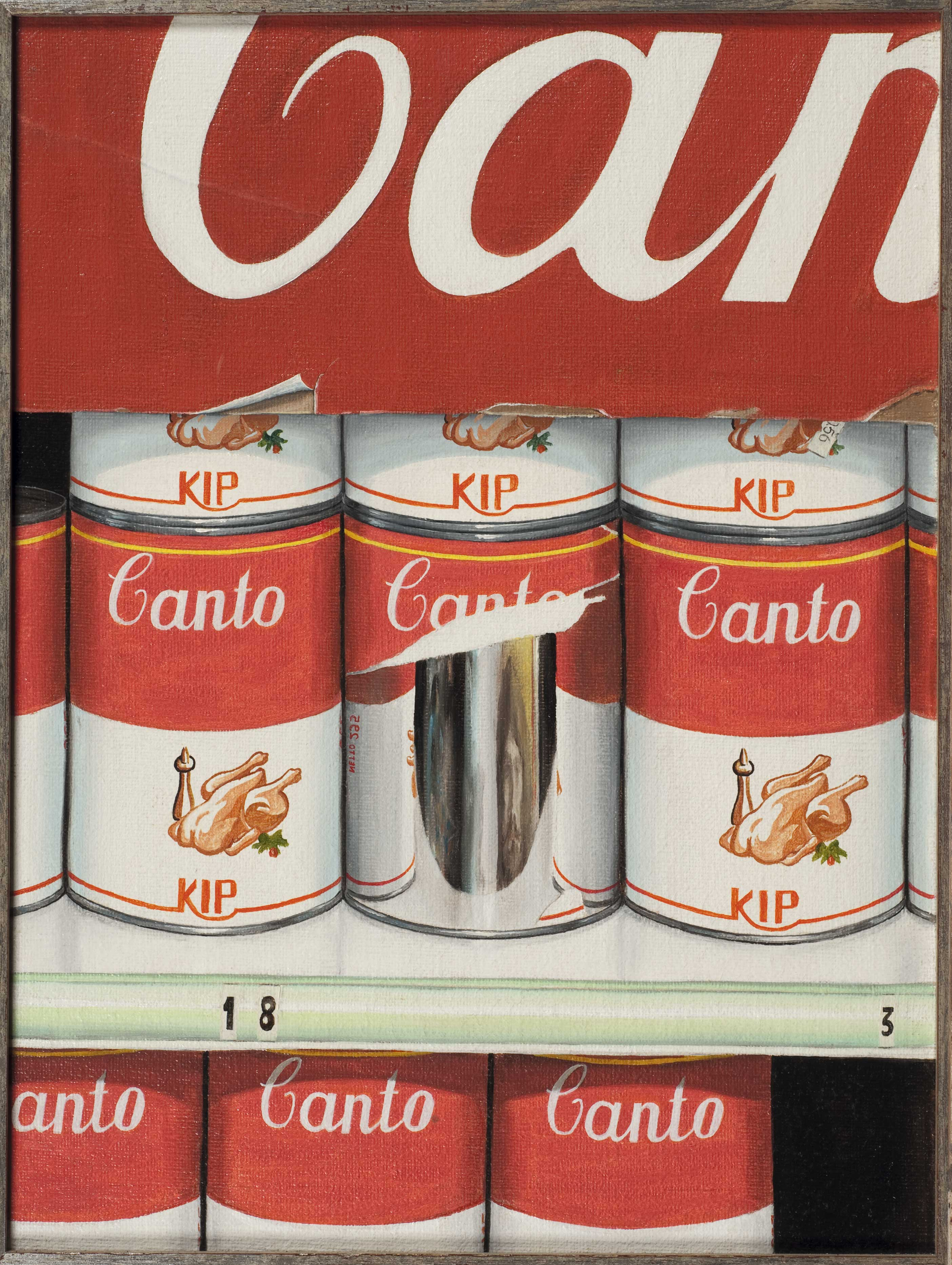
First Canto (1982). The first in a series of 124 paintings

== Motivation ==
Canto means i.a.: ‘each and every part of an epic poem’. Møhlmann therefore intends each painting to be like a Canto in which he follows his hero (the tin can) through time and depicts its fate in oil paint. He calls it an epic visual poem. The series was inspired by the painter's annoyance at the scorn and arrogance with which realistic art, for many years, had been labeled old-fashioned and dusty. He remarked: "that even the most trivial object from so-called known reality could hold enough artistic potential to occupy an entire painter’s life", and Møhlmann put his money where his mouth is. He opted for a tin can of which the naked, smooth, curved metal gave its own unique reflection of reality. In this way each painting not only shows the painter's view, but also the reflection in or of the tin can. The top of the can shows another piece of wrapper with the brand name Canto on it. In a broader sense, the entire project can be regarded as an artistic investigation of reality, hence the often appearing subtitle ‘Reflections on reality’.

== Development ==
The series have undergone several developments. Møhlmann only painted for 5 years when he started with the Canto Project. His painting technique develops and matures throughout the years. Growth is also noticeable in the manner with which he gives shape to his own ‘look at reality’. The painting technique is initially characterized by a slightly impressionistic touch on linen. After experimenting with finer linen for 3 years, the painter began to use wooden panels. He also refined the brushstroke, so that the texture or skin of various materials could be rendered more convincingly. The act of observation matures from fairly unambiguous to an increasingly more complex approach. This is evident, for example, by mini-series emerging within the larger series.

== The concept of time ==
The limitations that the painter has imposed on himself result not only in a series of 124 paintings, but also in a sequence with cinematic aspects. The can is always the same size and in the same place within the image plane. Therefore, one would observe a stationary can if all the Canto's would be subjected, in succession, to a filmic ´overfading´. The environment around the can would continually change while the can itself remains static. With that the Canto series, in a way, could be described as a painted movie, a primitive visual documentary. In this sense, the series deviates considerably from what is usual and possible within a single, independent painting. The series has a timespan of 11 years within which the can was followed by the painter. In a way, time was the co-creator. This makes the Canto Collection more than just the sum of 124 paintings. This time-frame of 11 years is also represented within the series in smaller parts. Canto 6 (1982) already bears witness to this in a subtle manner because a small piece of the label has unnoticeably disappeared. Diederik Kraaijpoel writes: "Within the main series there are many sub-series which usually contain an optical peculiarity so that the viewer constantly wonders: "What do I actually see?" An example of such a sub-series is shown by the Canto's 9 to 12 (‘An Investigation 1-5’, 1982). In a series of successive works, a glass jar is filled with more and more water so that the image changes all the time; in another sub-series we see the can falling one meter; or flowers that wither, or, simply the can during different parts of the day. The further the Canto project progresses, the more complex the concept of time becomes.

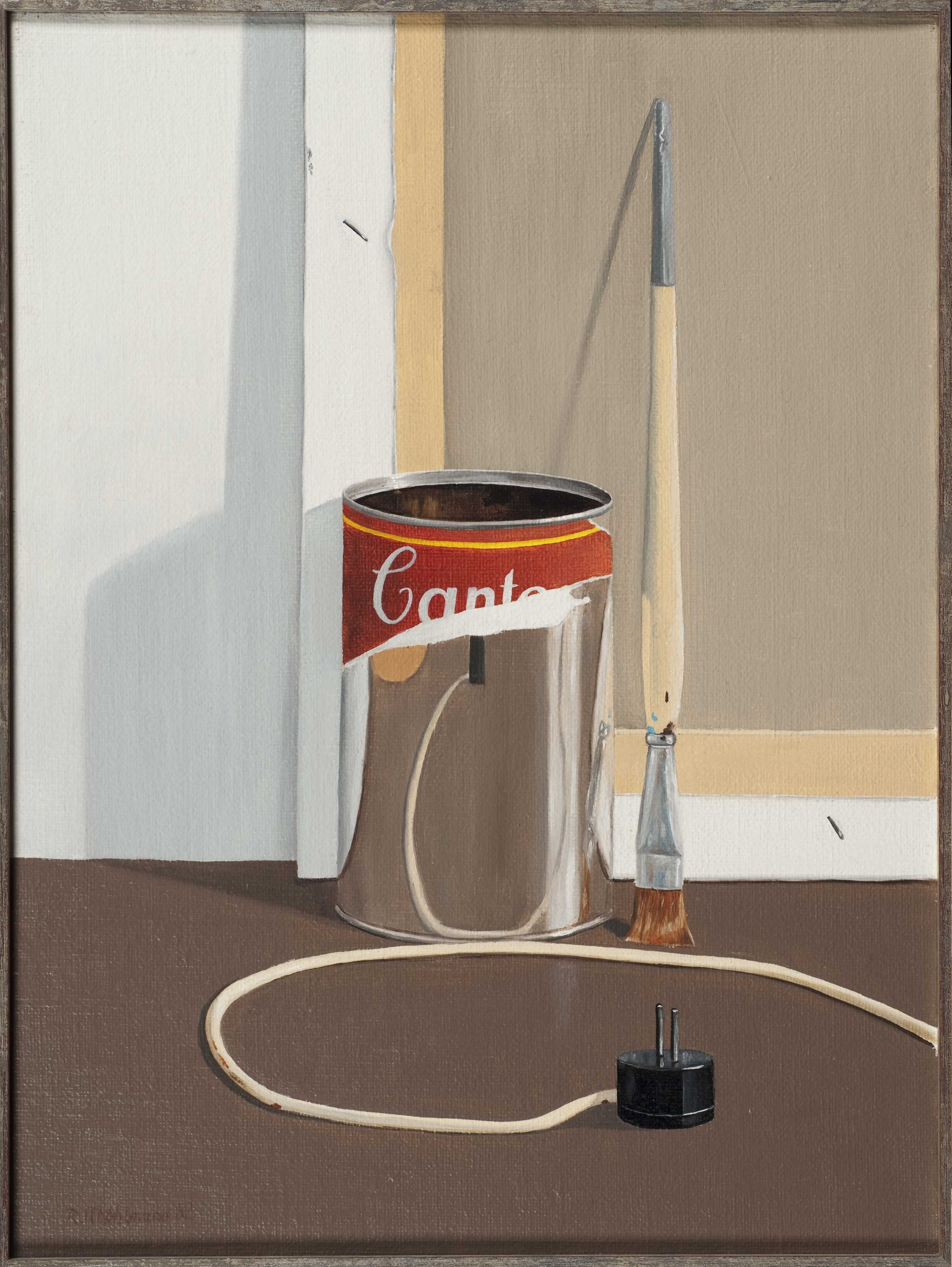
’’Canto 8,’’ An investigation-1

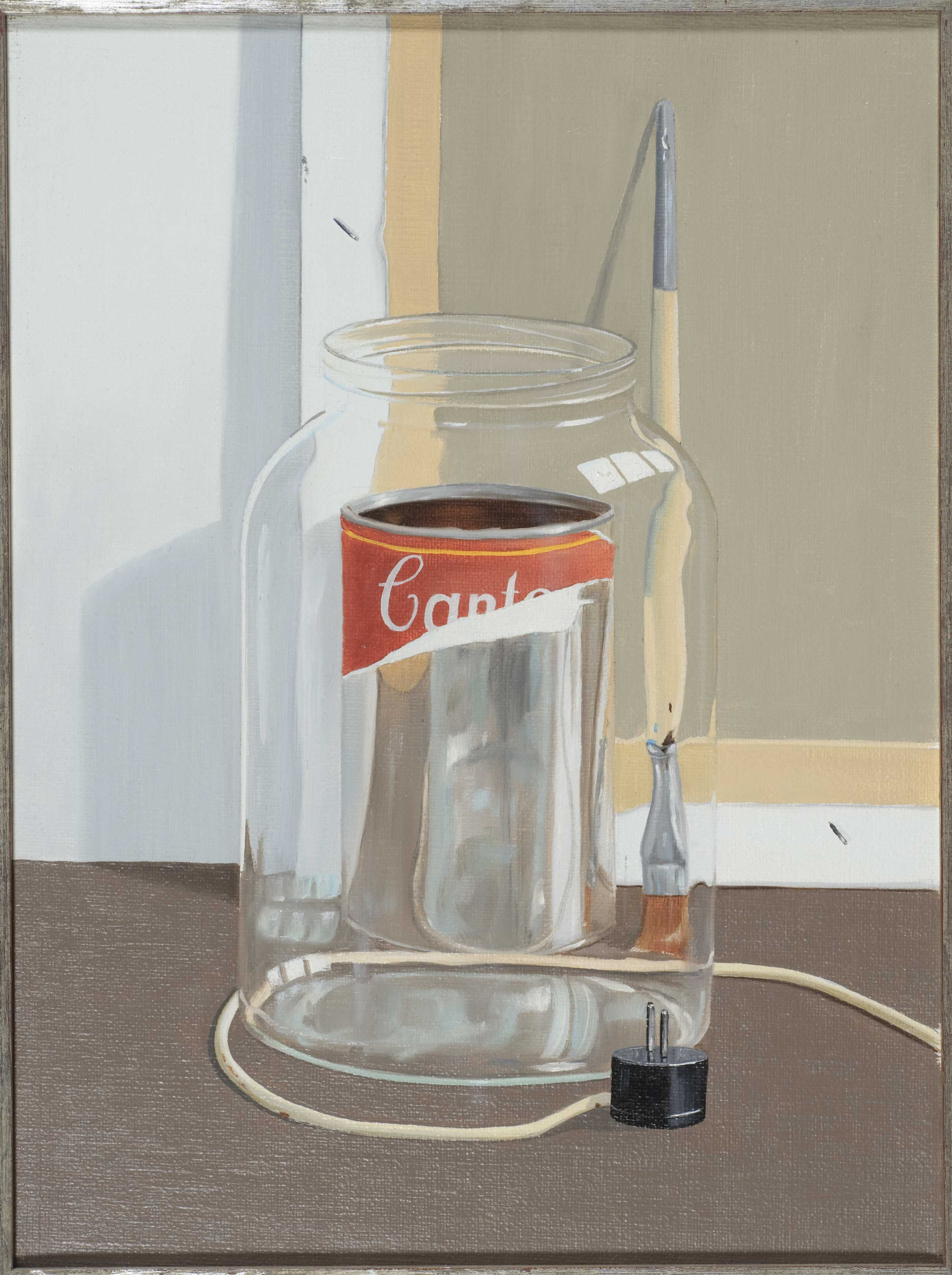
’’Canto 9,’’ An investigation-2

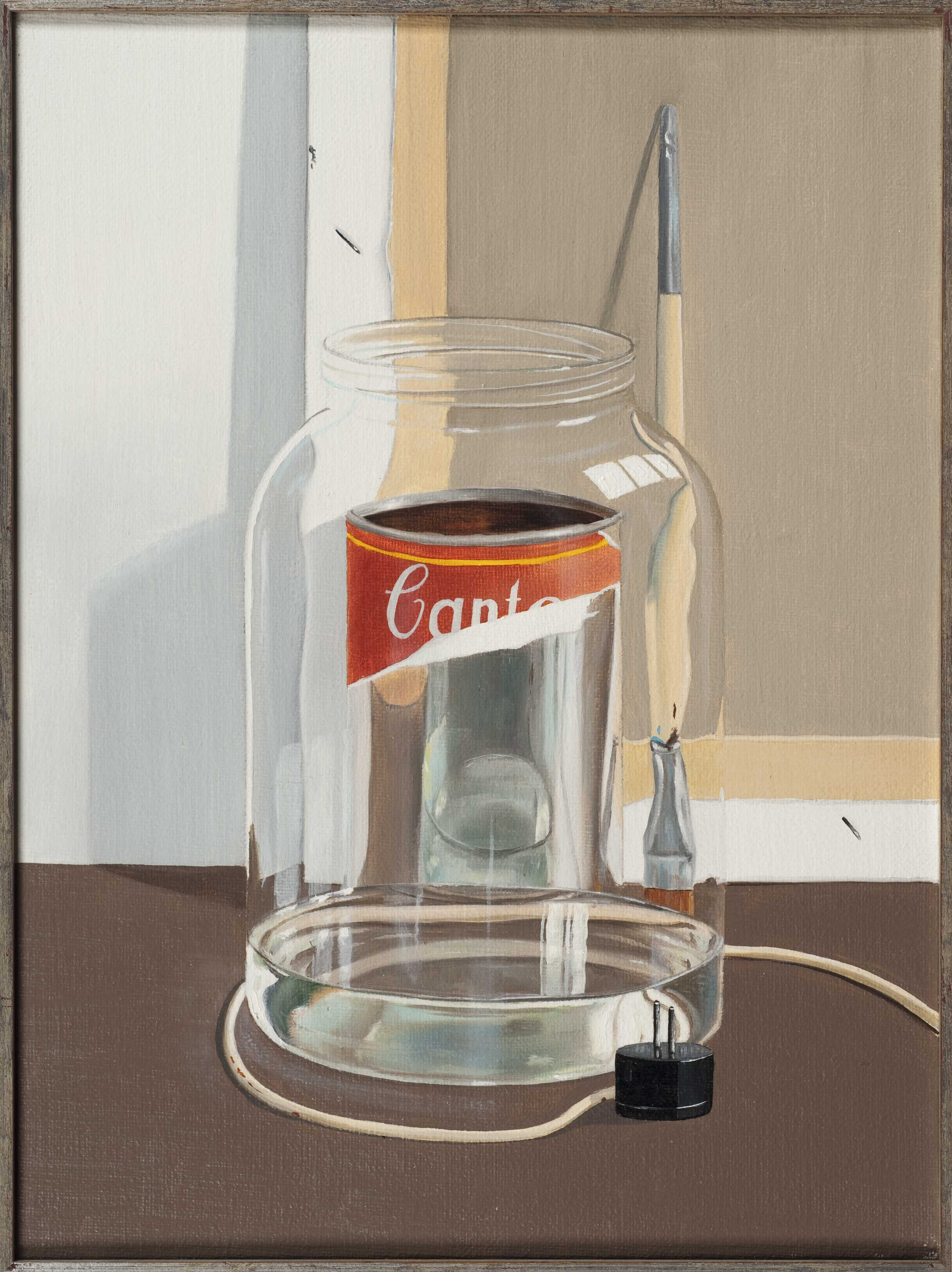
’’Canto 10,’’ An investigation-3

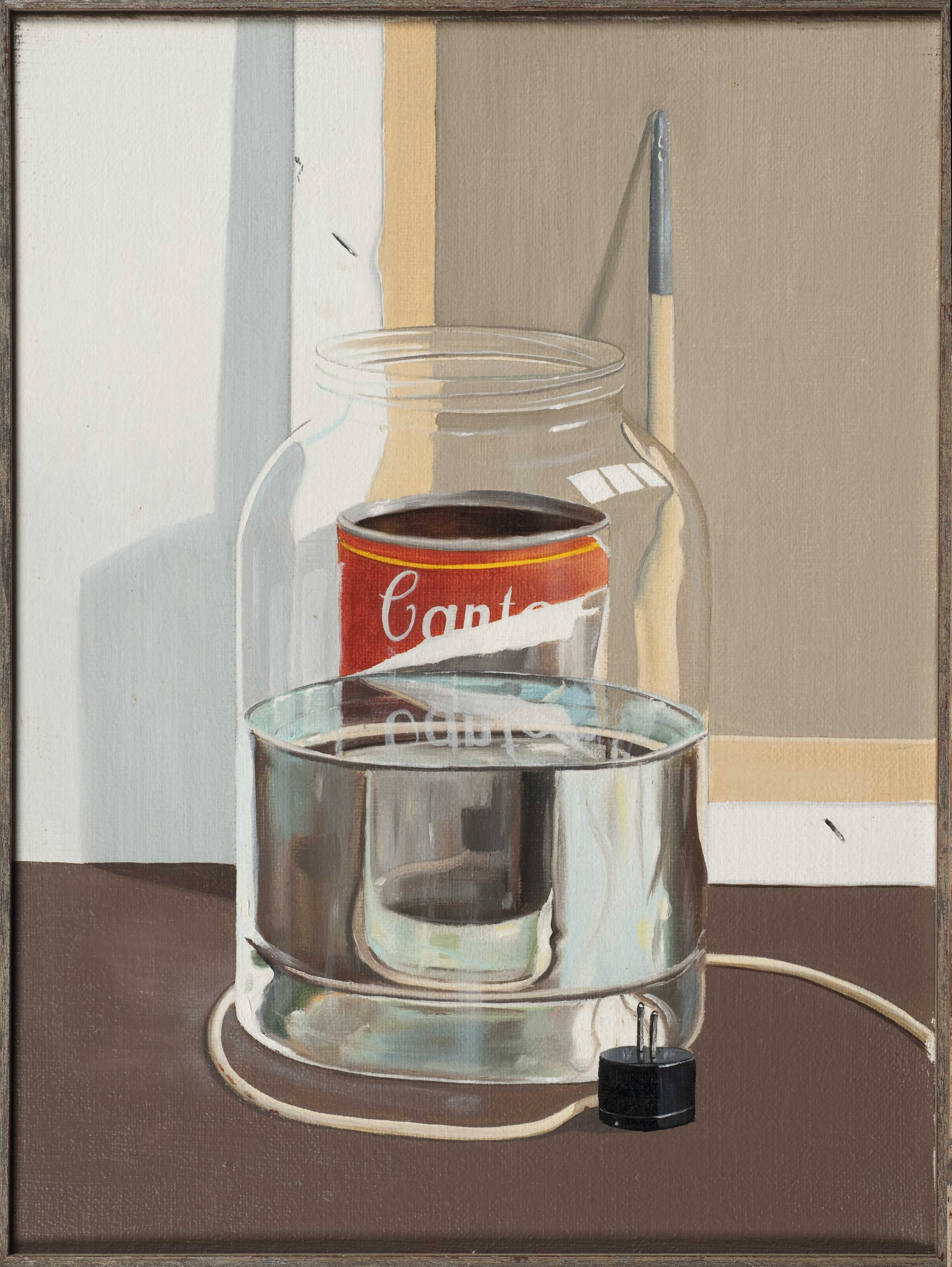
’’Canto 11,’’ An investigation-4

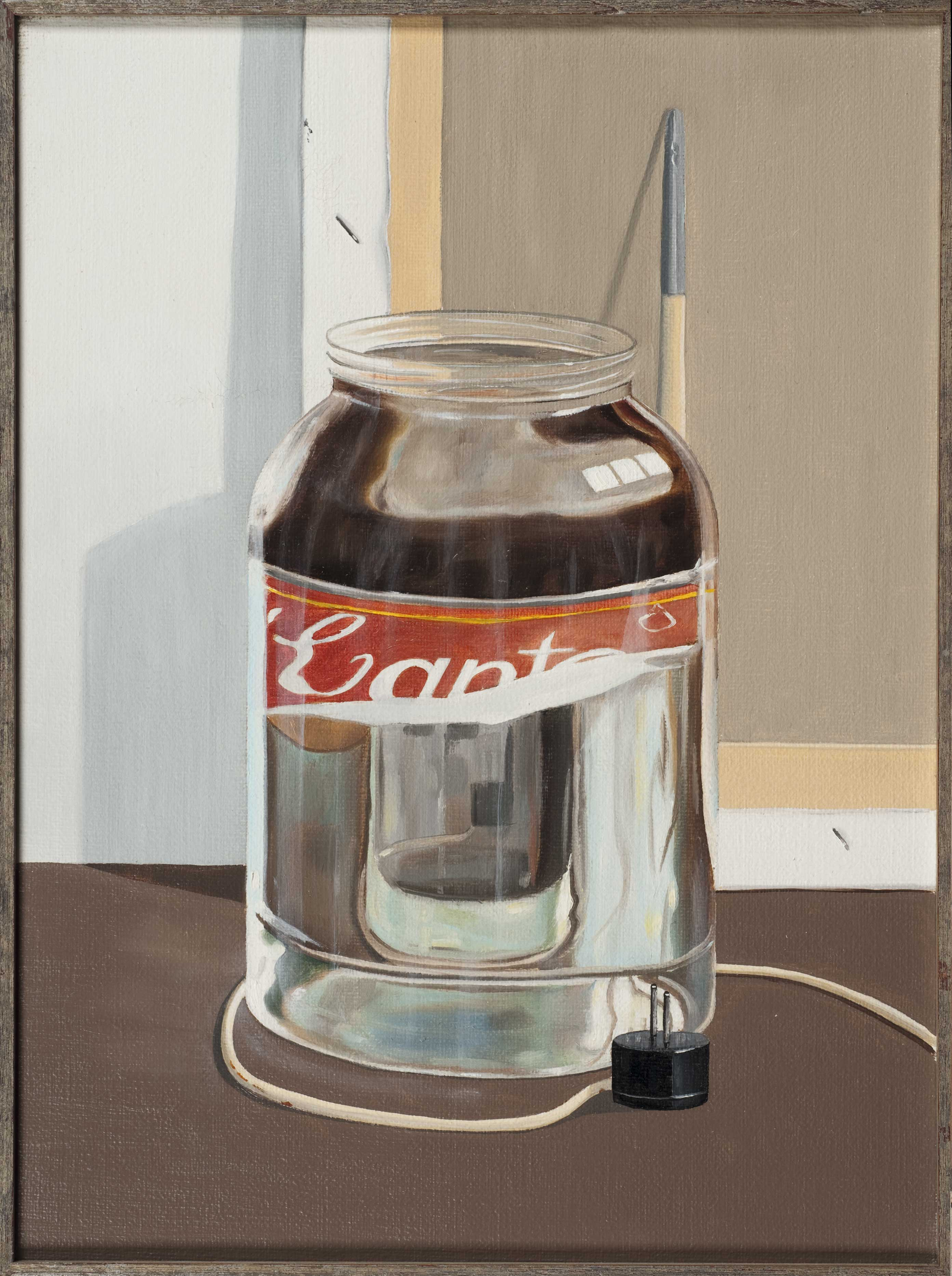
’’Canto 12,’’ An investigation-5

A penultimate sub-series (Canto 116-121, The Labyrinth, 1993) paints an excursion into the studio. The viewer jumps from one scene to the next; the scene following that (with the can that is to be depicted) is always seen in the background of the painting. The tour ends exactly where it began. It is as if time does not exist here, for we are sent back into the studio over and over again. Here time is as a cyclical phenomenon.

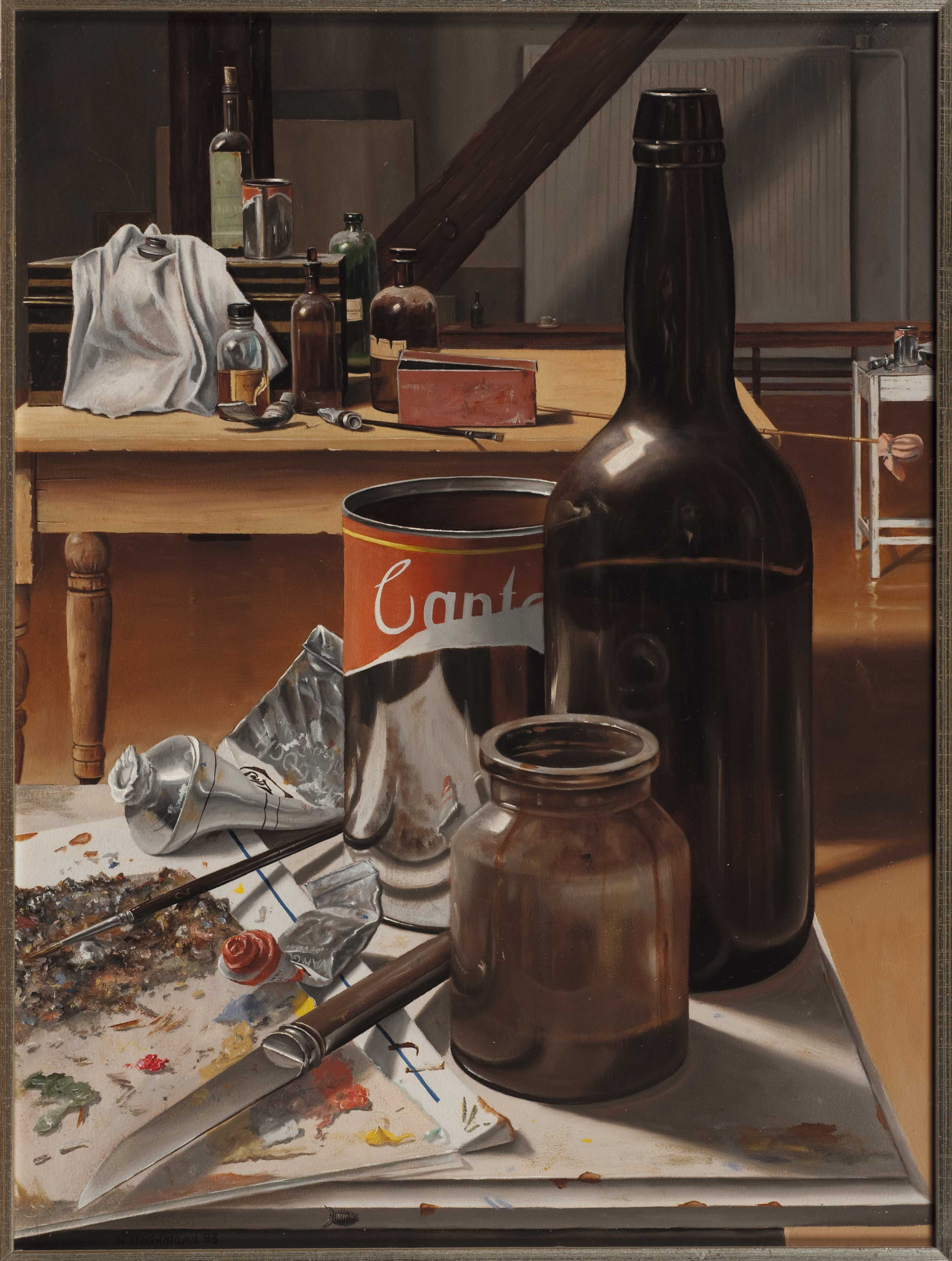
Canto 116, The Labyrinth-1

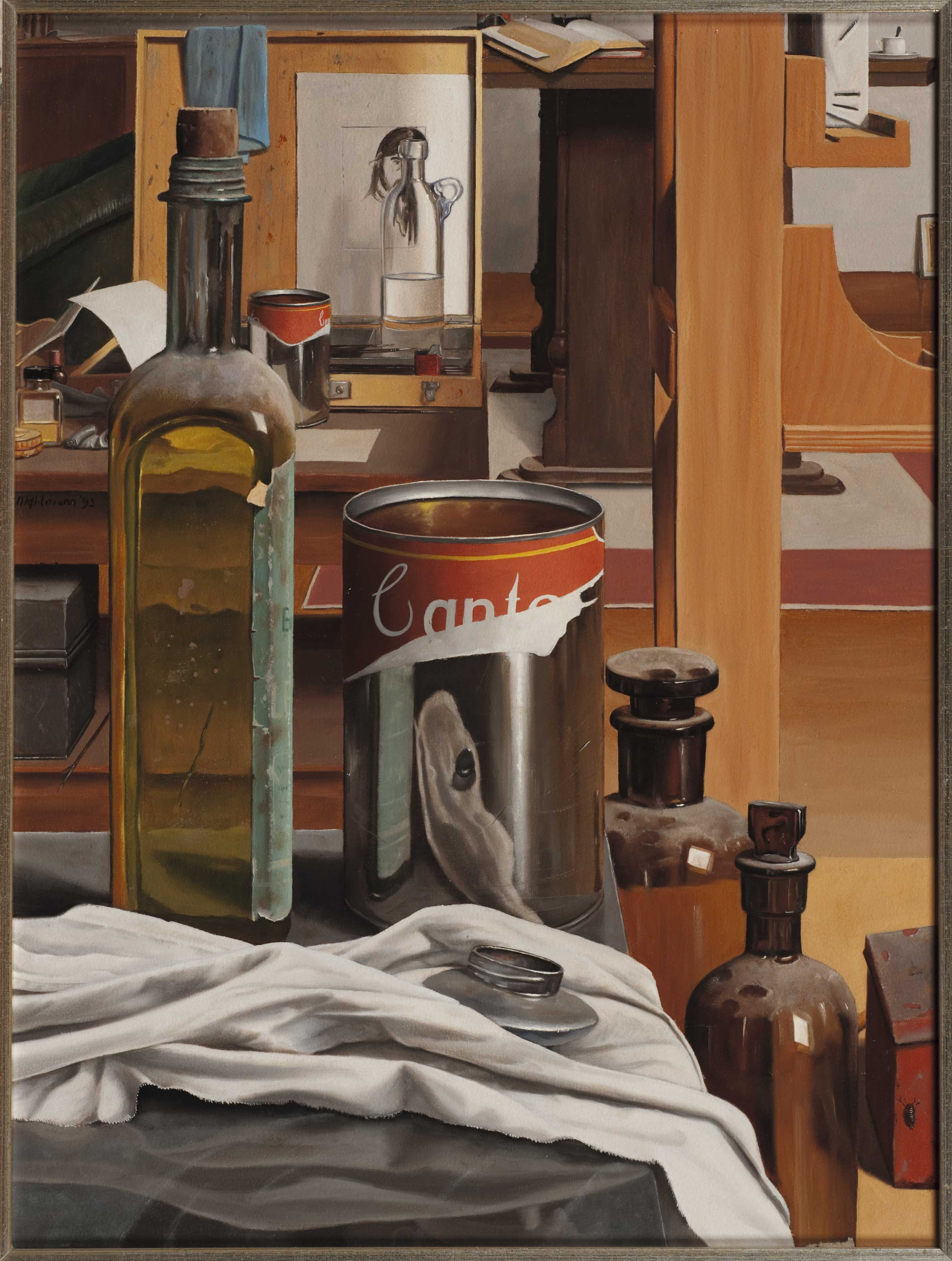
Canto 117, The Labyrinth-2

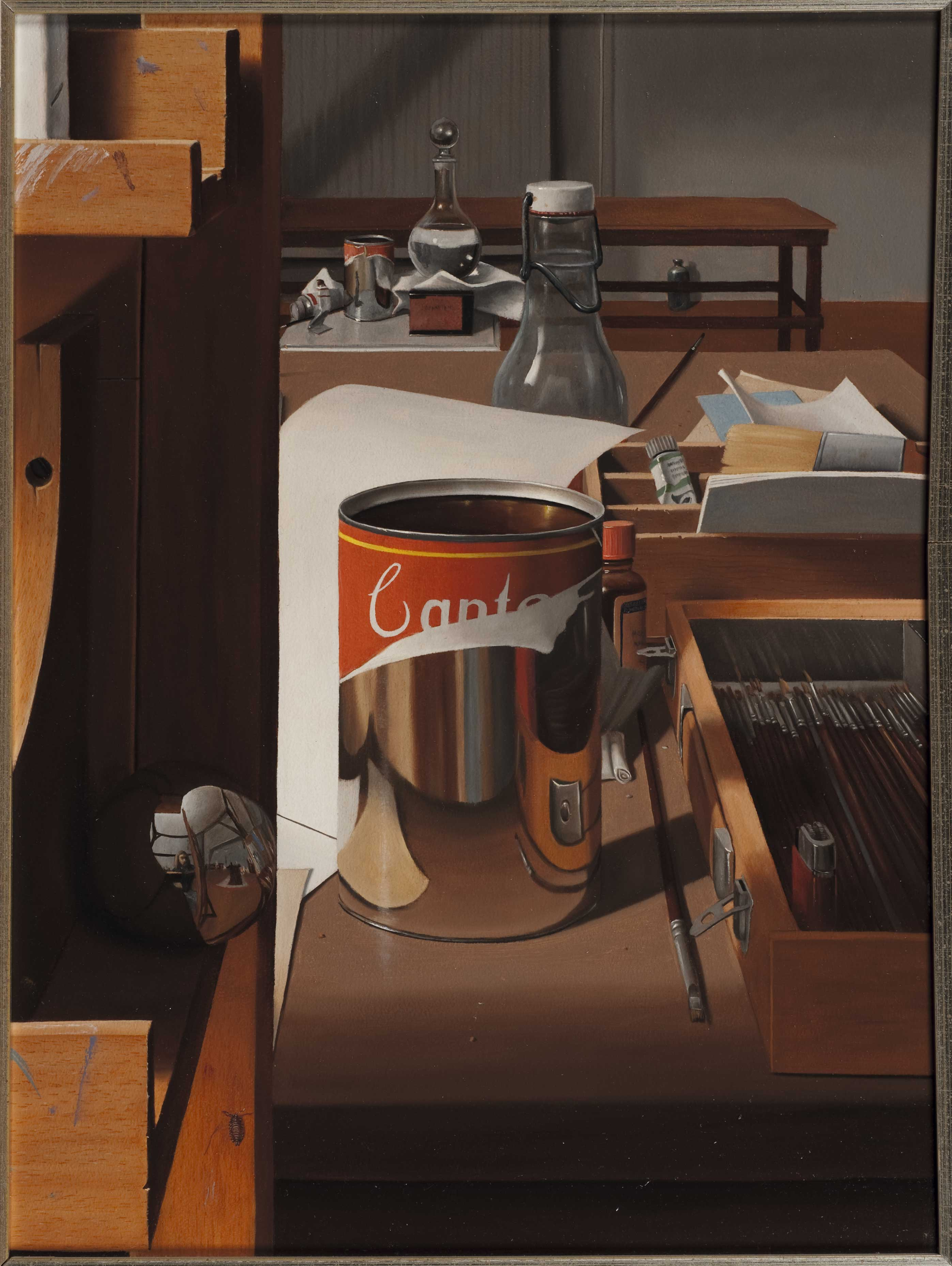
Canto 118, The Labyrinth-3

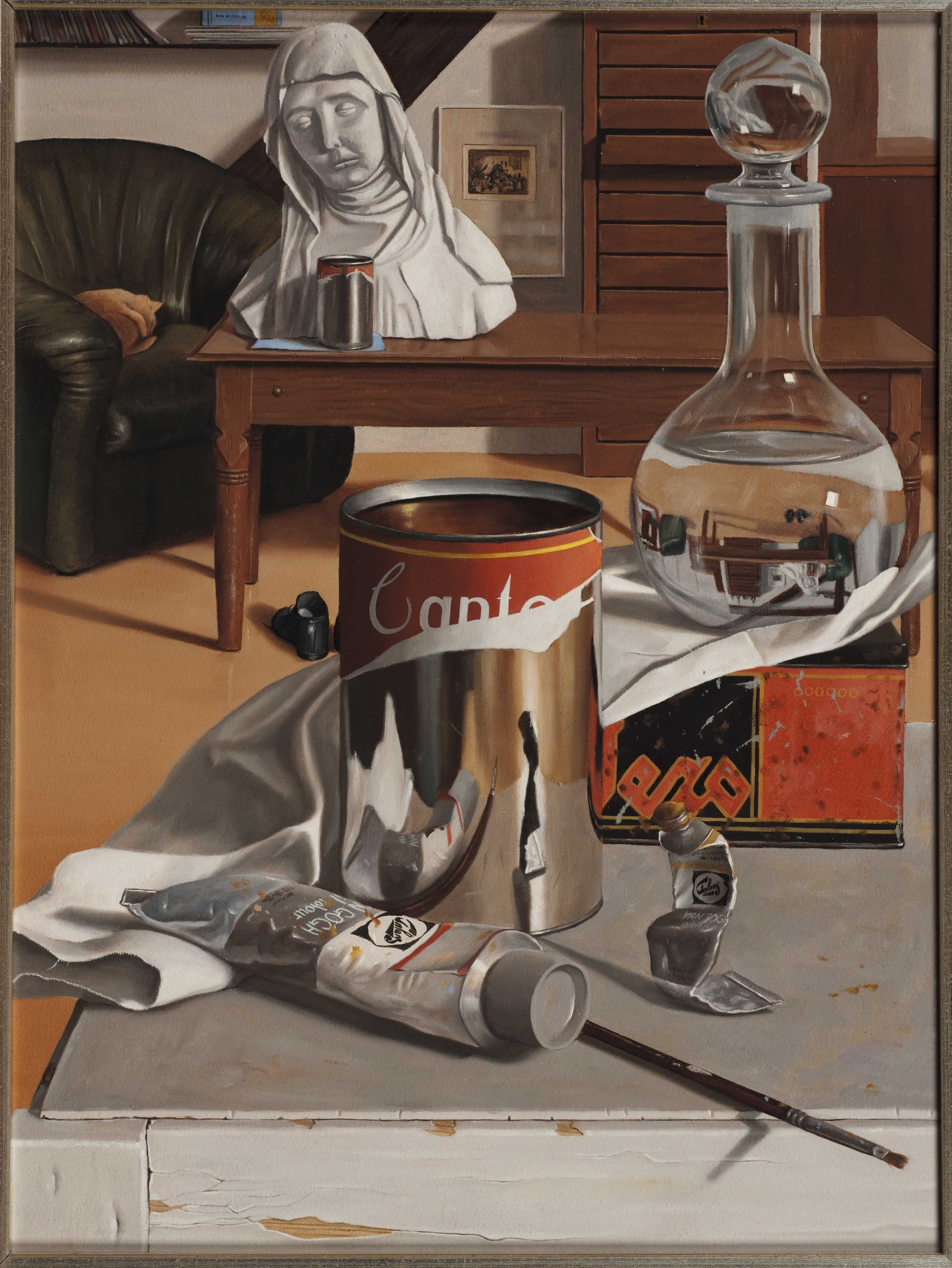
Canto 119, The Labyrinth-4

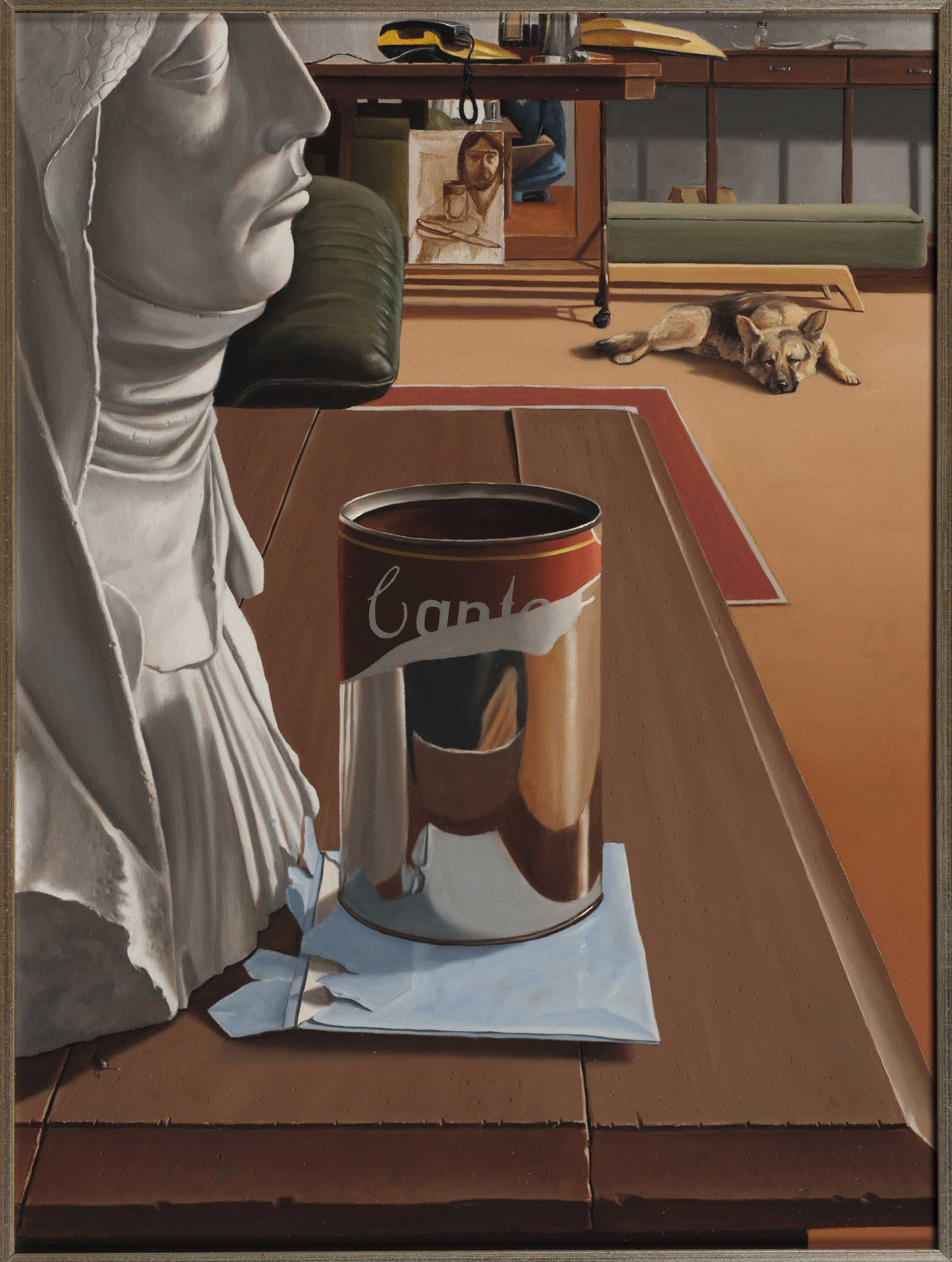
Canto 120, The Labyrinth-5

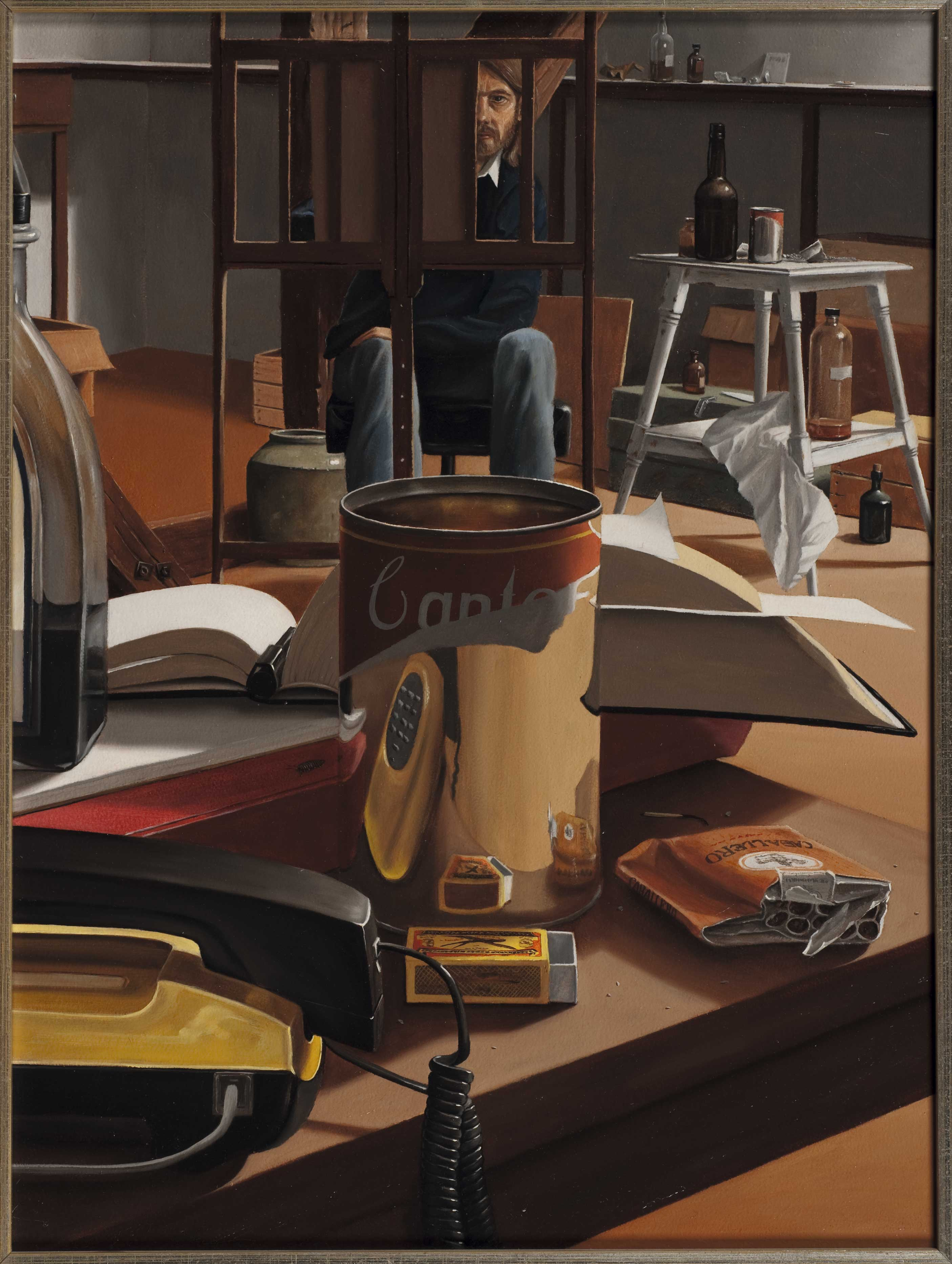
Canto 121, The Labyrinth-6

== Art and humour ==
Møhlmann has included many art styles and artists in the series. There are comments on Beuys, Mondriaan or Vermeer, or he makes his version of art historical subjects such as ‘the anatomical lesson’ or ‘the breakfast’ and ‘anamorphosis’.

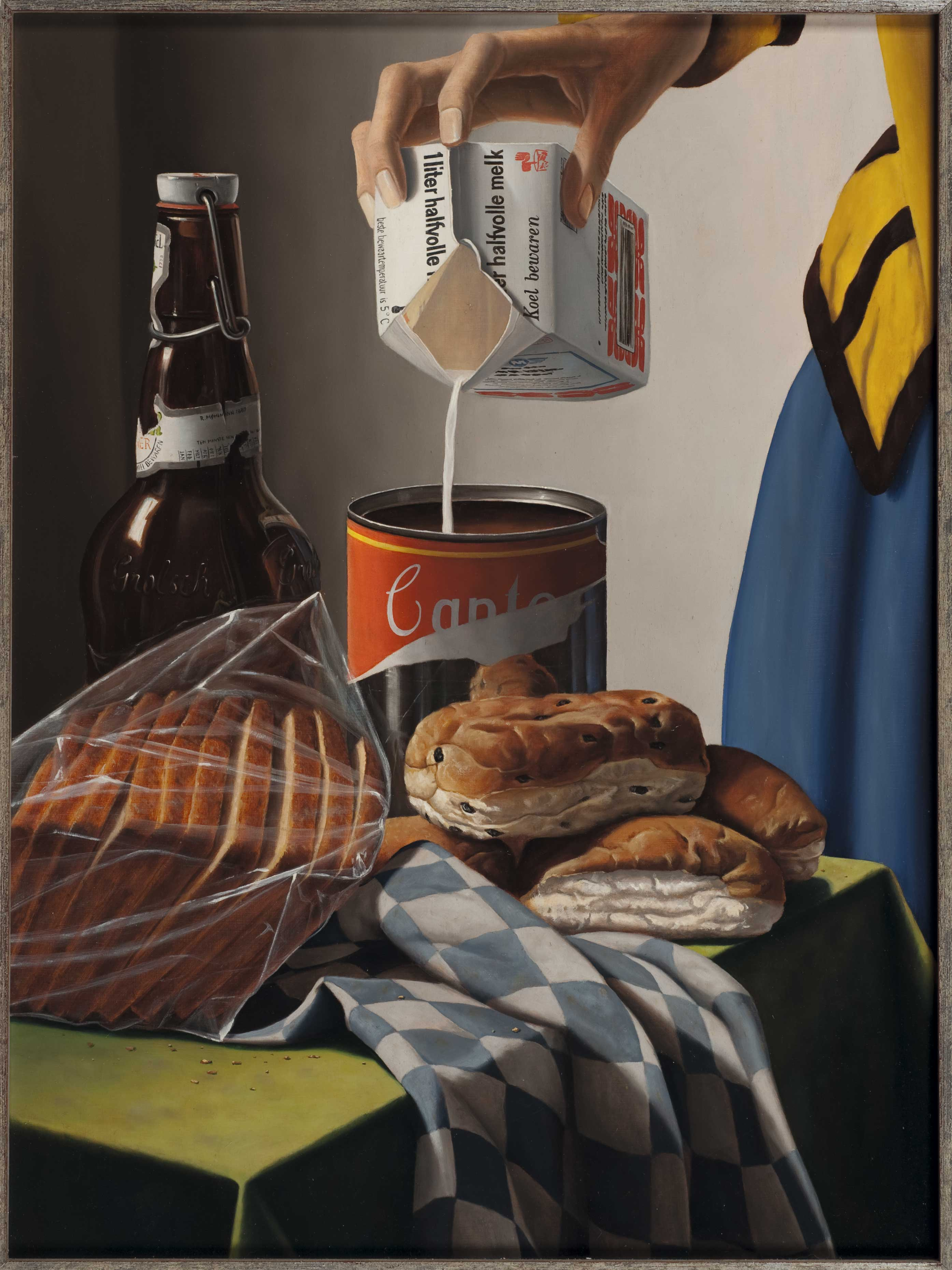
Canto 65, The Milkmaid

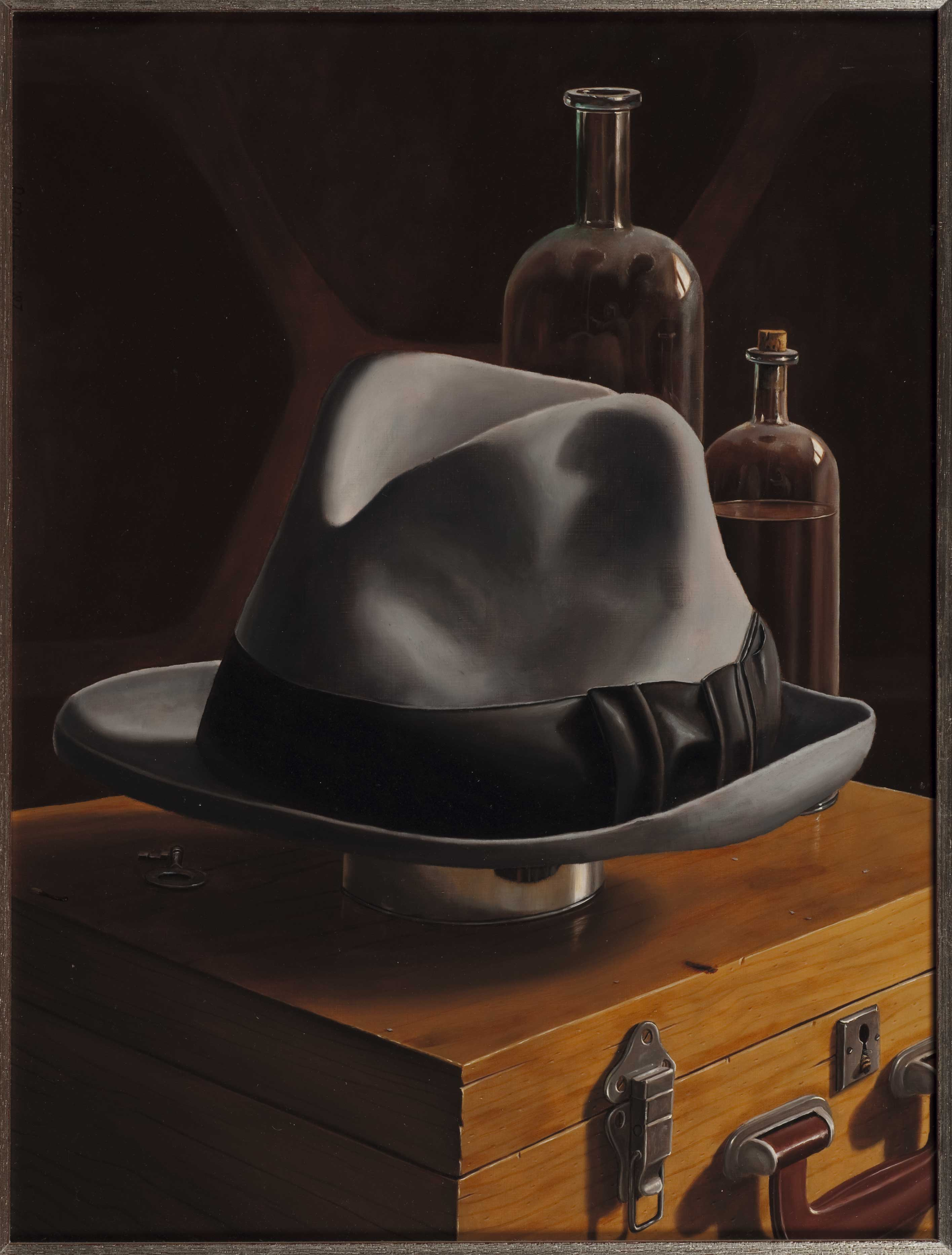
Canto 66, Wie mann dem toten Hut die Bilder erklärt

He also literally plays with surfaces so that it is not clear whether, for example, a woodlouse is part of the painting or actually runs over the surface of the painting. He also ‘destroys’ painting cloths, but this then appears to have been painted. In this manner the seriousness of the subject-matter is often downplayed by humour.

== Titles ==
The titles of all the Canto's are listed in a separate chapter because they often give slightly ironic indications as to how one could look at the painting. (Incidentally, this applies to most of the titles in Møhlmann's work). For example: the title of his Canto about Joseph Beuys (Canto 66, 1987): ‘Wie mann dem toten Hut die Bilder erklärt’, indirectly refers to Beuys’ 1965 performance How to Explain Pictures to a Dead Hare.

== Summary ==
The Canto Collection is one painting presented in 124 Cantos. It was created within a time span of 11 years. The painter follows the can throughout time in his studio, which makes it partly autobiographical. The project investigates, in its own way, what reality is or can be. The sharpness, humour, but also the craftsmanship and originality, make this work quite unique in contemporary art history. The series also gave rise to one important ‘spin-off’. In 1989, Møhlmann found his can on the floor (Canto 86, Ground pattern) and did not pick it up, but painted it from above. In 1990, this led to the first ‘top-down’, still life. The still life is seen perpendicularly from above and is a composition form hardly seen, if at all, in art history. According to this principle the painter would make many more works.

=== Exhibitions ===
1995

- January–February: Kunsthal Hof 88, Almelo
- February–March: Museum Swaensteyn, Voorburg
- April–May: Gemeentehuis Emmeloord, Emmeloord
- May–June: Cultureel Centrum de Klinker, Winschoten
- July–September: Museum ’t Markiezenhof, Bergen op Zoom
- October–November: Stedelijk Museum Bellamy 19, Vlissingen
- December–January: Cultureel Centrum De Vest, Alkmaar

1996

- February–March: Museum De Tiendschuur, Tegelen
- April–July: Akzo Nobel, Arnhem

1996

- October and afterwards: on permanent display in Museum ‘t Markiezenhof, Bergen op Zoom.

1997-1999

- The permanent status of the Canto exhibitions ends. During these years the Canto series is shown in its own exhibition space in Venhuizen.

2003

- During a large retrospective exhibition (25th anniversary as a painter) the Canto series are once more shown in an external exhibition space.

2008

- Opening of the new museum in a historical building in Appingedam. The Canto Collection permanently hangs in its own exhibition space.

== Publications ==
1997 Publication of book Het Cantoproject 1982-1993 by Publisher Van Soeren & Co in Amsterdam, with an introduction by J. Jacobs. 2011 Publication of the Canto Collection as a museum publication in Dutch, English and German, Museum Møhlmann in Appingedam.

=== Trivia ===
1. Canto Ostinato and The Canto Collection.
  Independently of each other, Simeon ten Holt (Dutch composer 1923-2012) and Rob Møhlmann created, under a similar title, a musical and painted representation of the same, constantly recurring, but always slightly different, theme. The two artists did not know each other or each other's work, but spoke to one-another by telephone much later, around 2003. In 2014 and 2016, Møhlmann organized performances of De Canto Ostinato in his own museum, while the public could view the Canto Collection at the same time.
2. The can
  The can itself exists, dates from 1982 and was bought in a supermarket in Amsterdam-Zuid. Almost all Western cans at that time were already fitted with a ribbed profile (which gives more strength), but a few imported cans from Asia, for example, kept the smooth hull a little longer. One of them became the model for the Canto series.
