= Museum Møhlmann =

Art museum Groningen (provence)

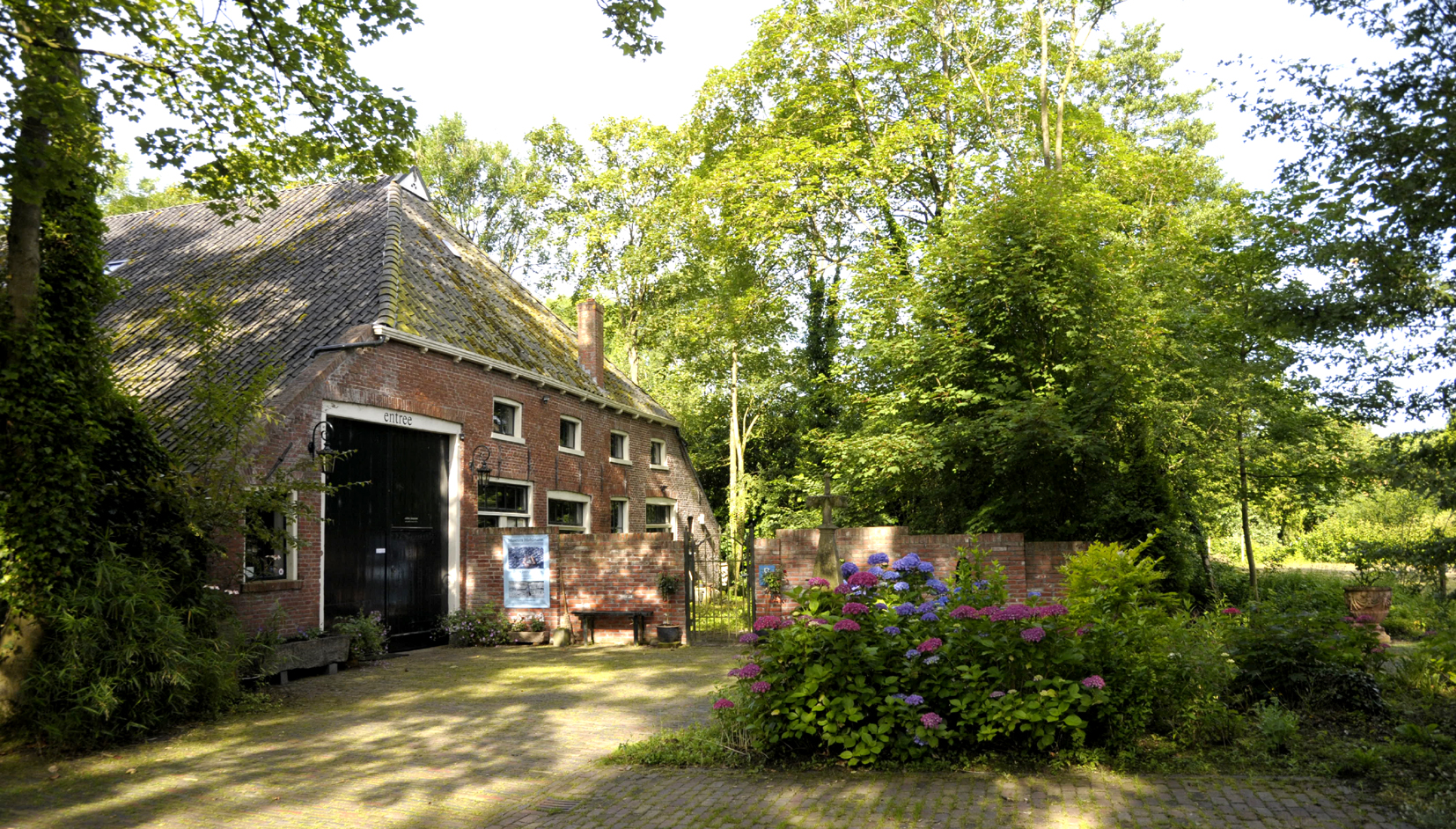
- Entrance museum
- Established: 1998
- Location: Westersingel 102-104; Appingedam
- Type: Contemporary realistic and figurative art
- Director: Rob Møhlmann
- Website: www.museummohlmann.nl

Museum Møhlmann is a privately owned museum for Dutch realistic and figurative art. It is situated in Tjamsweer near Appingedam in the province of Groningen in the Netherlands. The museum was founded in 1998 in Venhuizen and moved to its new location in 2008.

It is an initiative of the realist painter Rob Møhlmann and does not receive government subsidies. Together with his wife, Laura Møhlmann-de Grijs (1949–2010), he created a stage for Dutch contemporary visual art as well as a collegial bond with fellow-artists. It developed into an idiosyncratic, nationally oriented artists’ museum.

== Development ==
=== Venhuizen ===
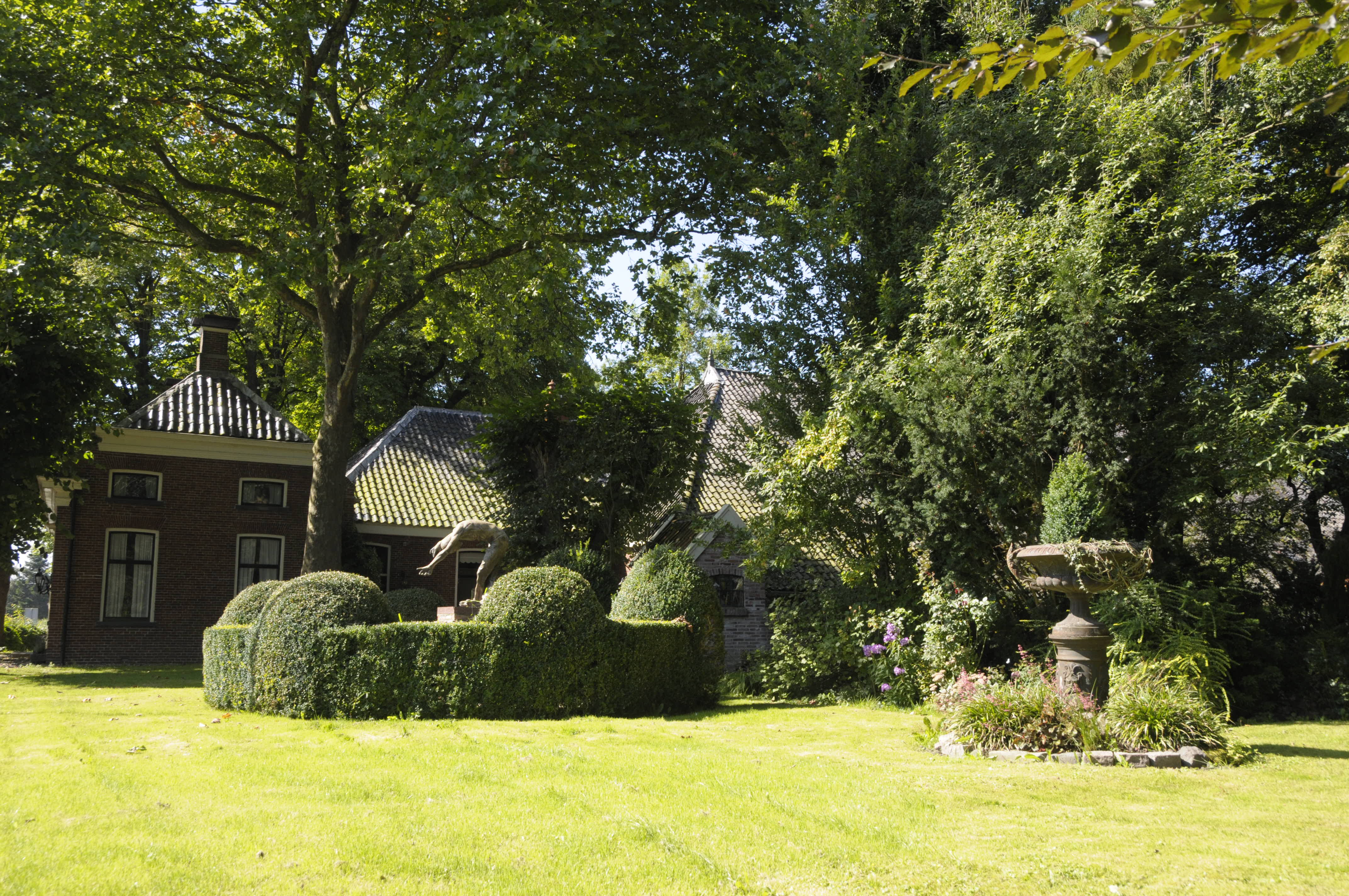
View of the museum and sculpture garden

After Rob Møhlmann and his wife moved from Amsterdam to Hoorn in 1988, he severed ties with the Amsterdam art gallery ‘Lieve Hemel’ and started selling his work from two shop windows behind which his studio was located.

In 1990 the couple moved to a dilapidated farmhouse in the vicinity of Venhuizen. Here Møhlmann built his art studio under a pyramid shaped roof. During the years that followed a studio/art gallery was built. From 1995 onward, he sold his own work from this location.

In 1998, the artist organized the first ‘Independent Realists Exhibition’ (ORT – Onafhankelijke Realisten Tentoonstelling) in which 30 renowned artists from the Netherlands were featured (including Evert Thielen, Henk Helmantel, Sam Drukker and Rein Pol).

Since then, the Independent Realists’ Exhibition is an annually recurring event where approximately 100 realist artists exhibit their work to the public. The couple bought their first works of art during this period and exhibited the Canto Collection as a permanent collection.

In 2000 another move followed, namely to a small former dairy purification factory, also in Venhuizen. The storage shed was converted into a museum and six exhibitions were held each year, including the annual ORT. In 2005 Museum Møhlmann and the Panorama Museum in Bad Frankenhausen organised the exhibition ‘Naar het leven - Neuer Realismus in den Niederlanden’ (After Nature-New Realism in the Netherlands) in which the work of 10 renowned Dutch artists was shown in the context of contemporary Dutch Realism. The exhibition was shown in both Germany and the Netherlands and a trilingual catalogue was published.

=== Appingedam ===
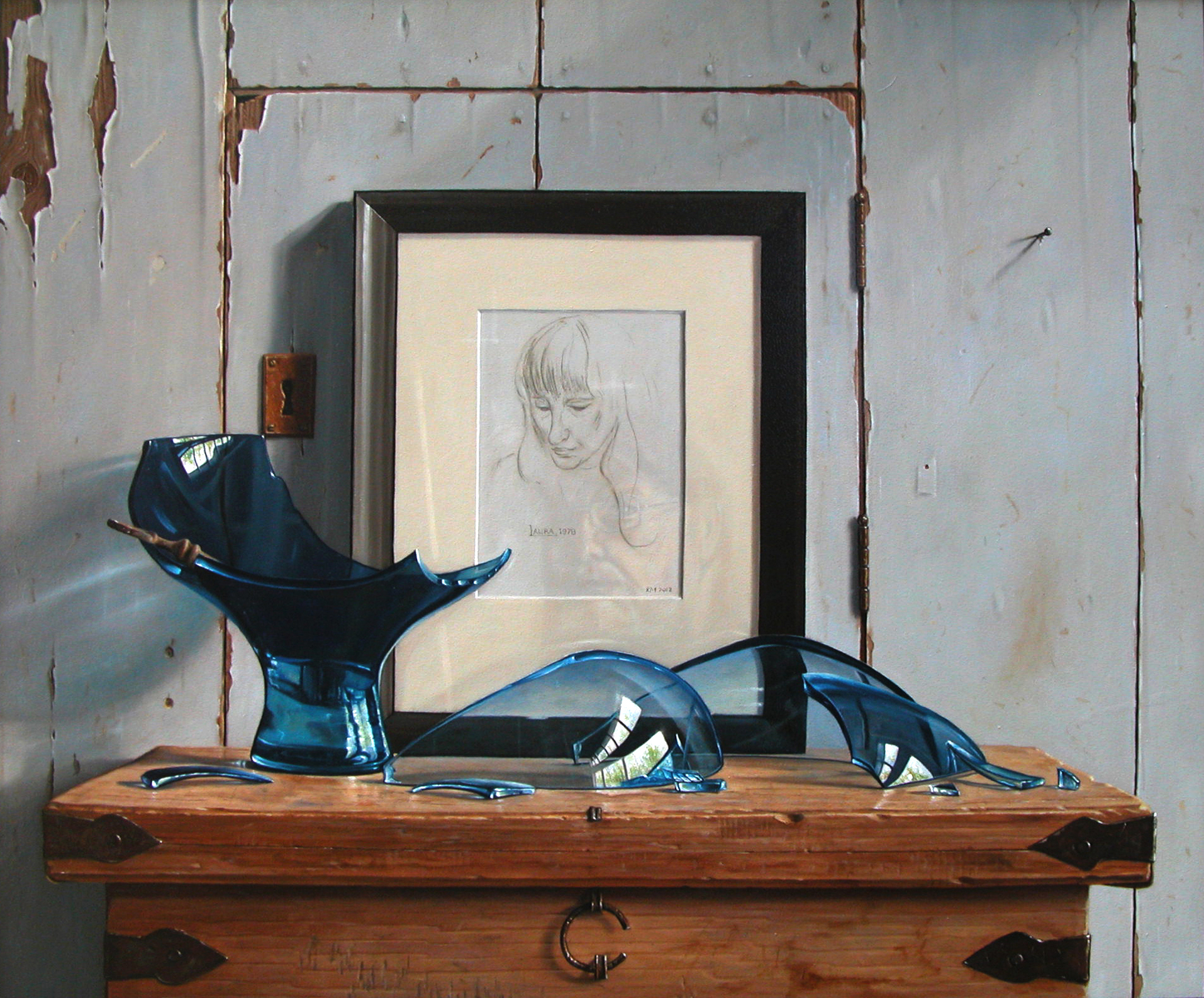
From the Møhlmann Collection Broken Blue (2012)

In 2006 another move ensued, this time to the monumental farmhouse ‘De Muzeheerd’ in Appingedam. After a massive renovation, the museum first opened its doors at the end of 2008. At the new location there are three exhibitions a year.

In 2010 museum director Rob Møhlmann devised an ‘image biography’ which depicts the life of Jan Mankes (1889–1920) with approximately 500 old postcards, photographs, books, documents, etc. His wife and muse Laura Møhlmann-de Grijs (1949–2010) died in the autumn of 2010. This was one of the reasons why Møhlmann organised the exhibition ‘Mijn Muze’ (My Muse) in 2011, in which 77 artists exhibited works of their, or inspired by their, muse.

In 2012 there was the exhibition ‘Varken in Vorm’ (Pig in Shape) which aroused a great deal of interest, including from the television programme ‘Vrw.zkt.knst - Vrouw Zoekt Kunst’ (Woman Seeks Art). During the following year, Møhlmann realised that he could not paint and run a private museum at the same time. He chose to stop painting after 35 years.

In the course of the years that followed, he increasingly began to regard the museum as a ‘work of art’ in its own right and gradually began expanding it. First with the ‘Mankes Cabinet’, then with a proper storage room, after that a ‘Graphics Attic’ and a ‘Gothic Gallery’ with medieval art objects. The sculpture garden was also beginning to take shape. The museum has received the ‘Museum Discovery Award’ in 2016 and in 2017; of all the contenders it received the most public votes.

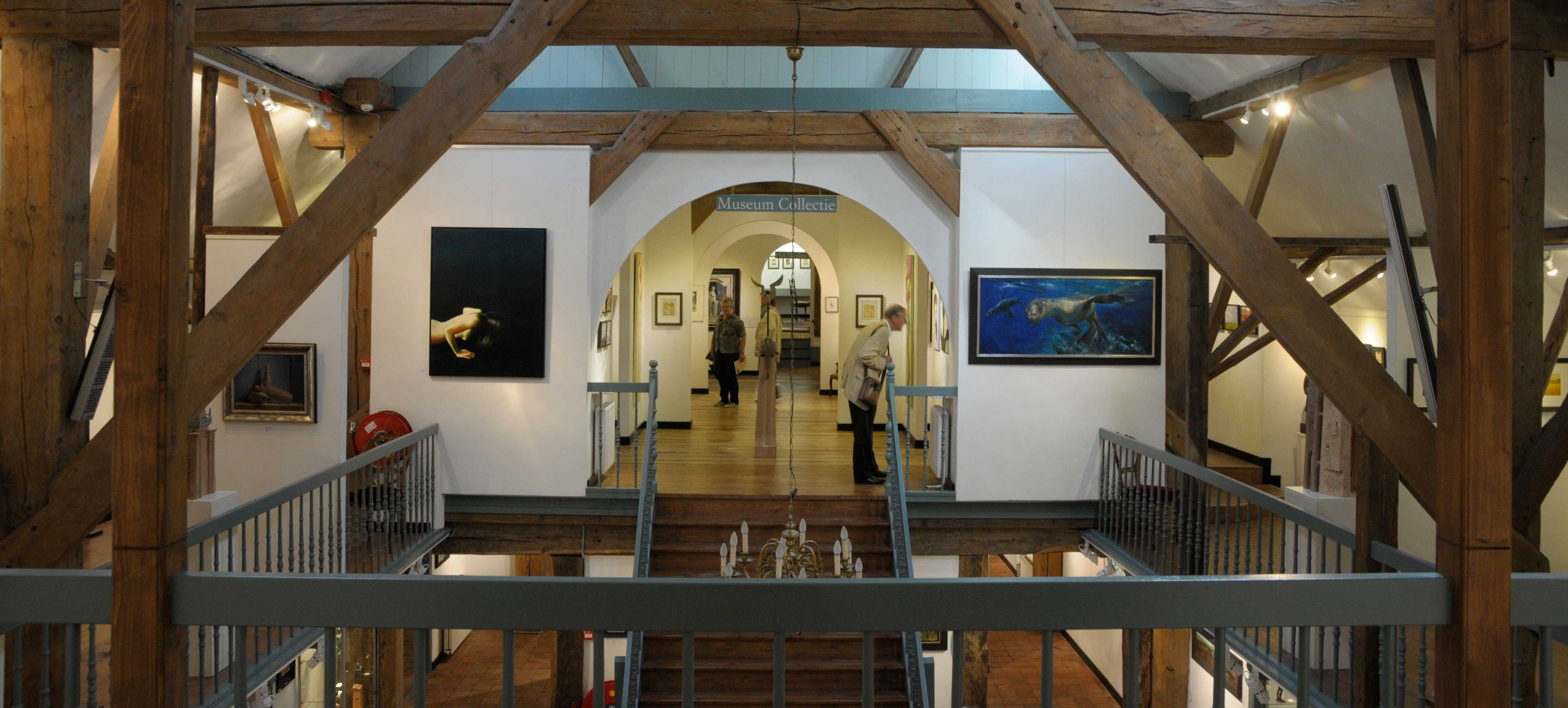
Interior
