= Rob Møhlmann =

Dutch artist (born 1956)

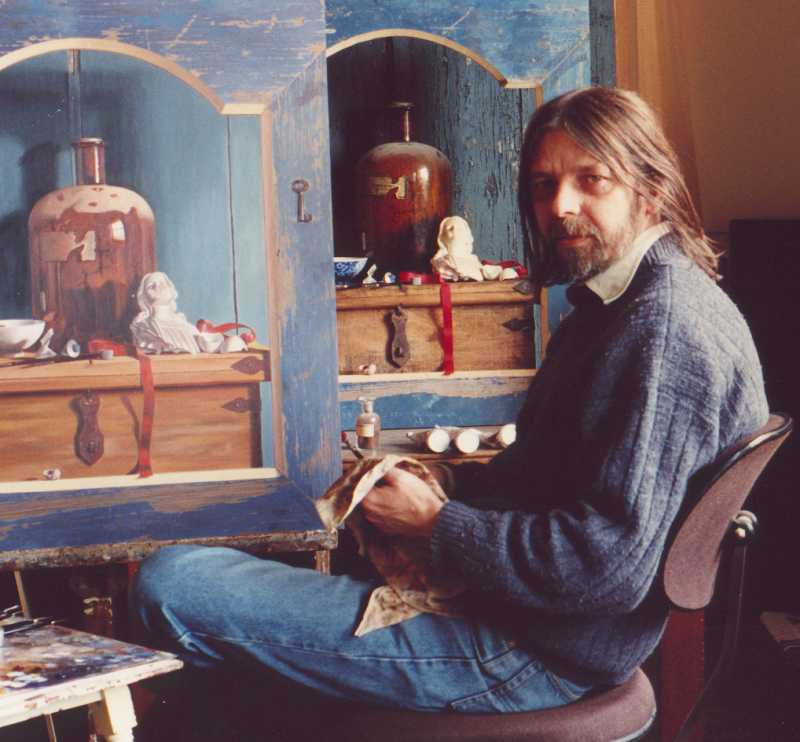
- Born: 18 March 1956 (age 70)
- Style: Realistic
- Awards: Golden Museum Discovery Award
- Website: www.museummohlmann.nl

Rob Møhlmann (born 18 March 1956, Hillegom) is a Dutch artist, poet and writer of art books. He would predominantly manifest himself as a visual artist, but also wrote several articles, collections of poems, and dozens of books on art. In addition, he started his own museum "to house art that represents something", conceived and organized numerous exhibitions. He would also accumulate a large art collection.

== Biography ==
=== Youth and first steps ===
Rob Møhlmann started drawing as an adolescent. Initially he made (cartoon-like) comics and landscapes with pencil and ink. During the last year of secondary school he painted his first oil paintings. In 1977 he started the teacher training course at the D’Witte Lelie in Amsterdam. The autonomous artists training appealed much more to him but was frowned upon by his parents. Convinced that he was not learning anything at the art academy, he left after only six weeks, together with his girlfriend (also a student at the D’Witte Lelie) who later became his wife, Laura de Grijs (1949–2010). As an autodidact he further developed his art and art skills. Having initially occupied himself with various themes and subjects, after several years he eventually devoted himself to still life painting, although he remained interested in the nude, portraits, landscapes and (dilapidated) cityscapes.

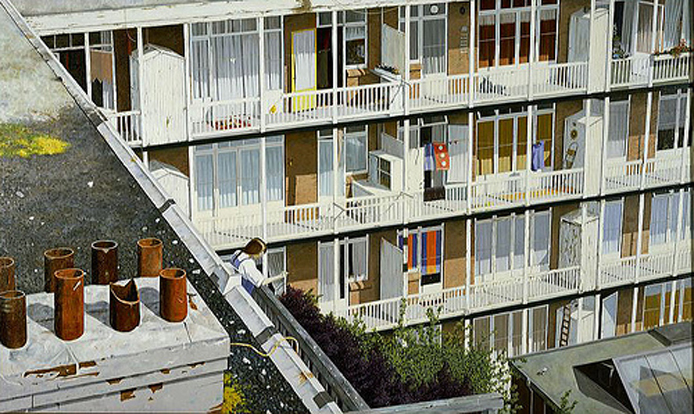
Perspective (1982). Example of a cityscape (Collection Amsterdam Museum)

After meeting graphic artist J.M. van Lieshout in 1979, Møhlmann taught himself the art of etching. He has made approximately 20 etches.

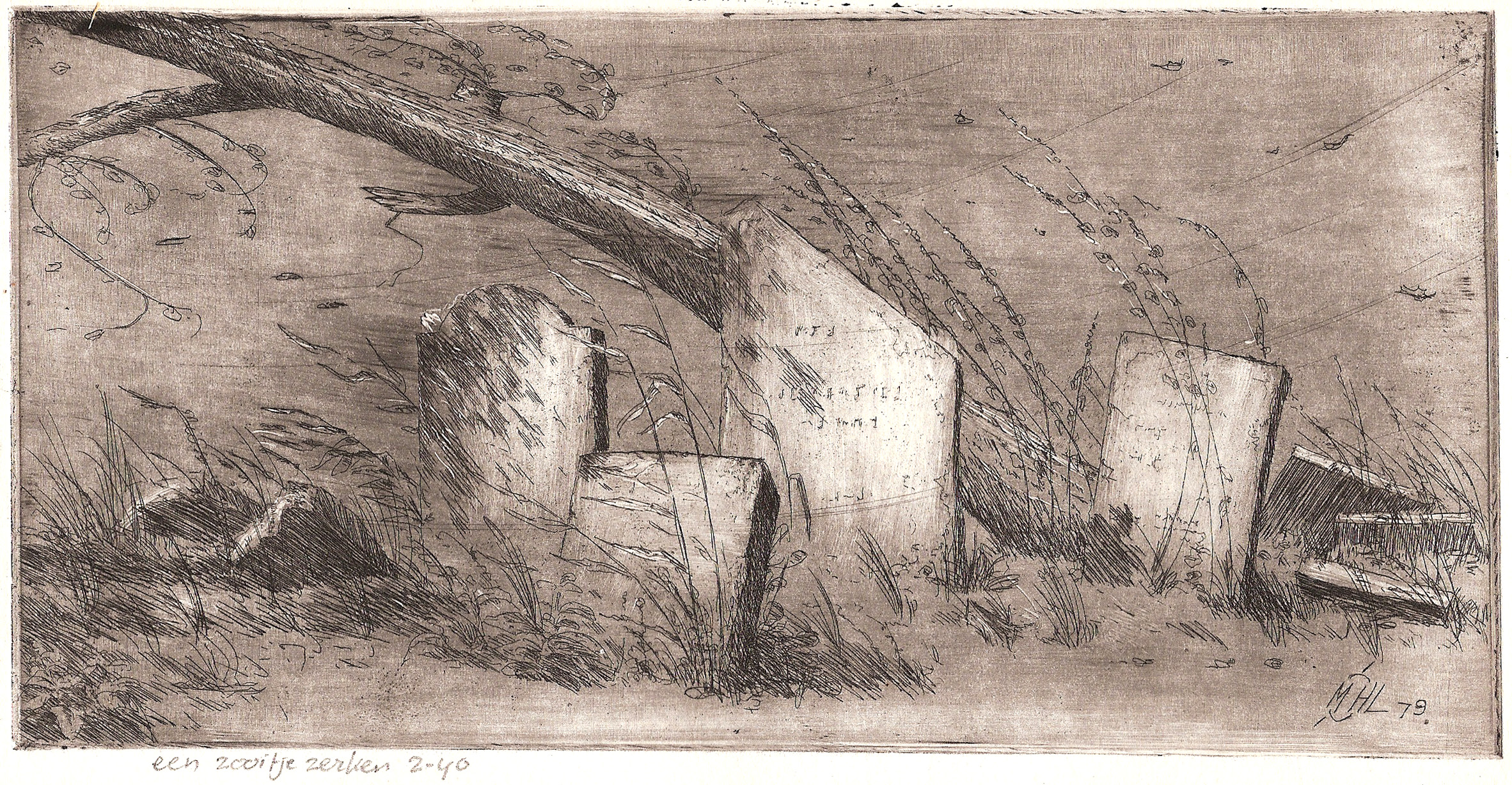
Bunch of tombstones (1979). Example of an etching

=== Development as an artist ===
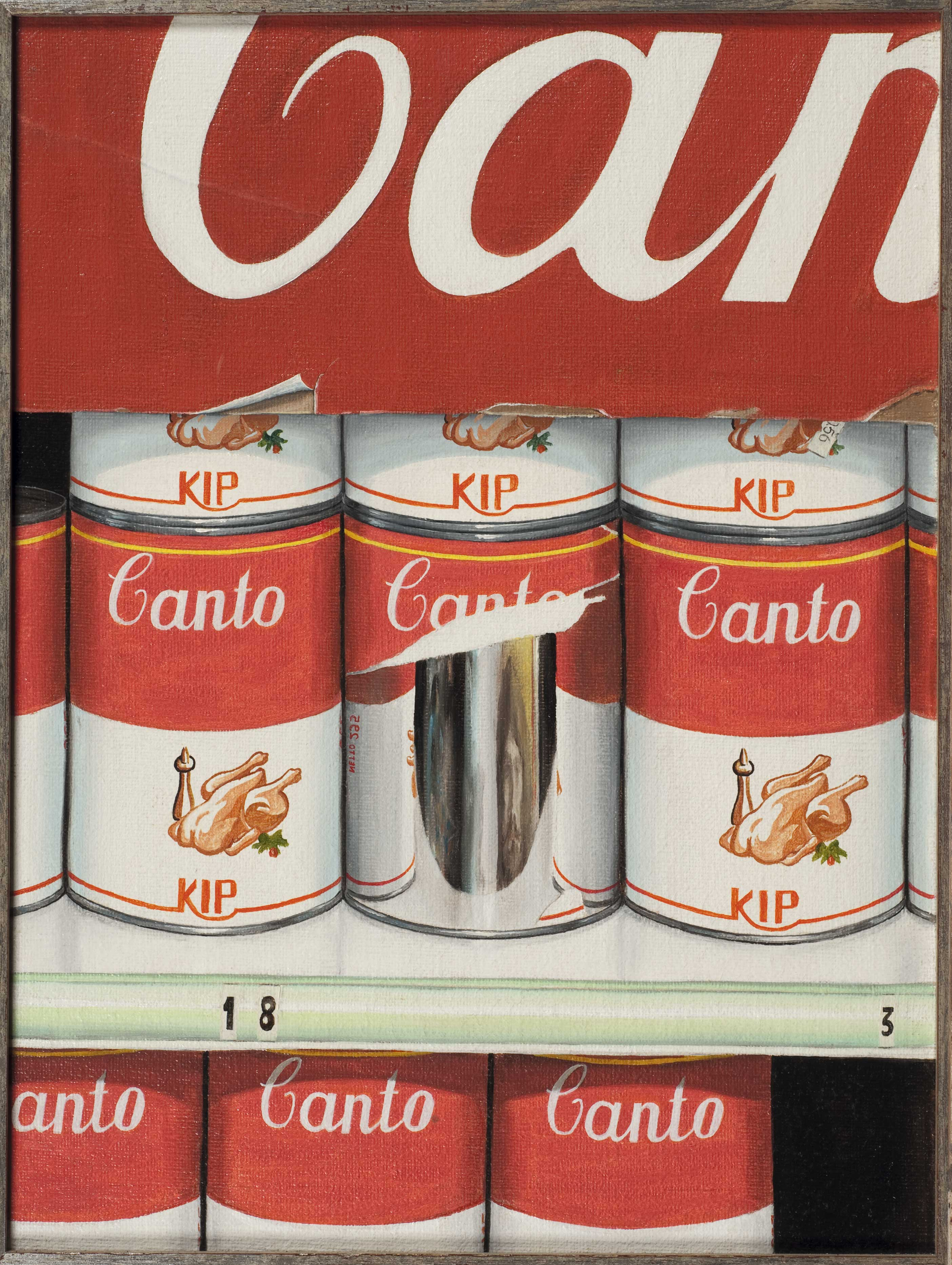
First Canto (1982). The first of a series of 124 Canto paintings

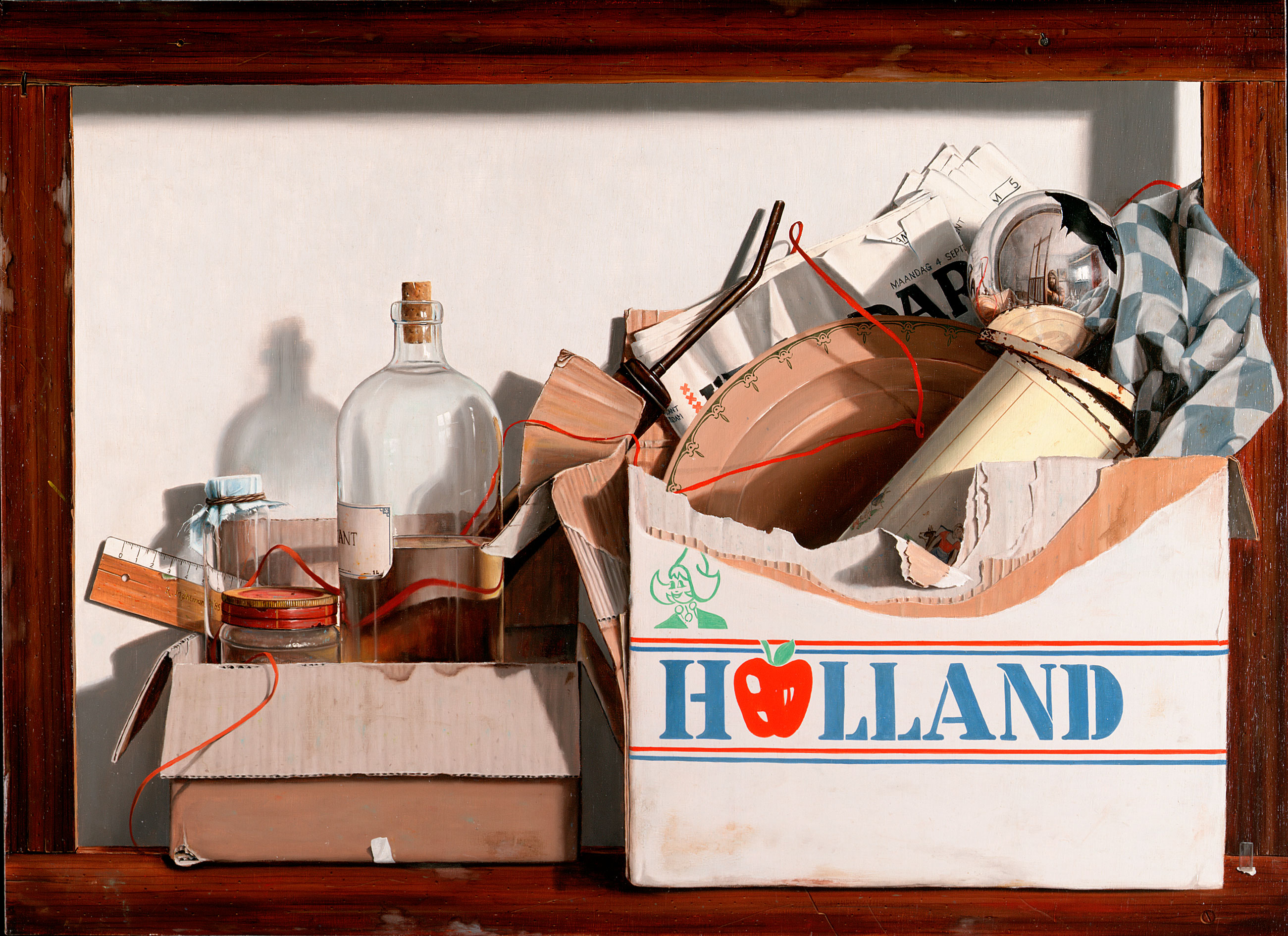
Perspective (1982). Example of a cityscape (Collection Amsterdam Museum)

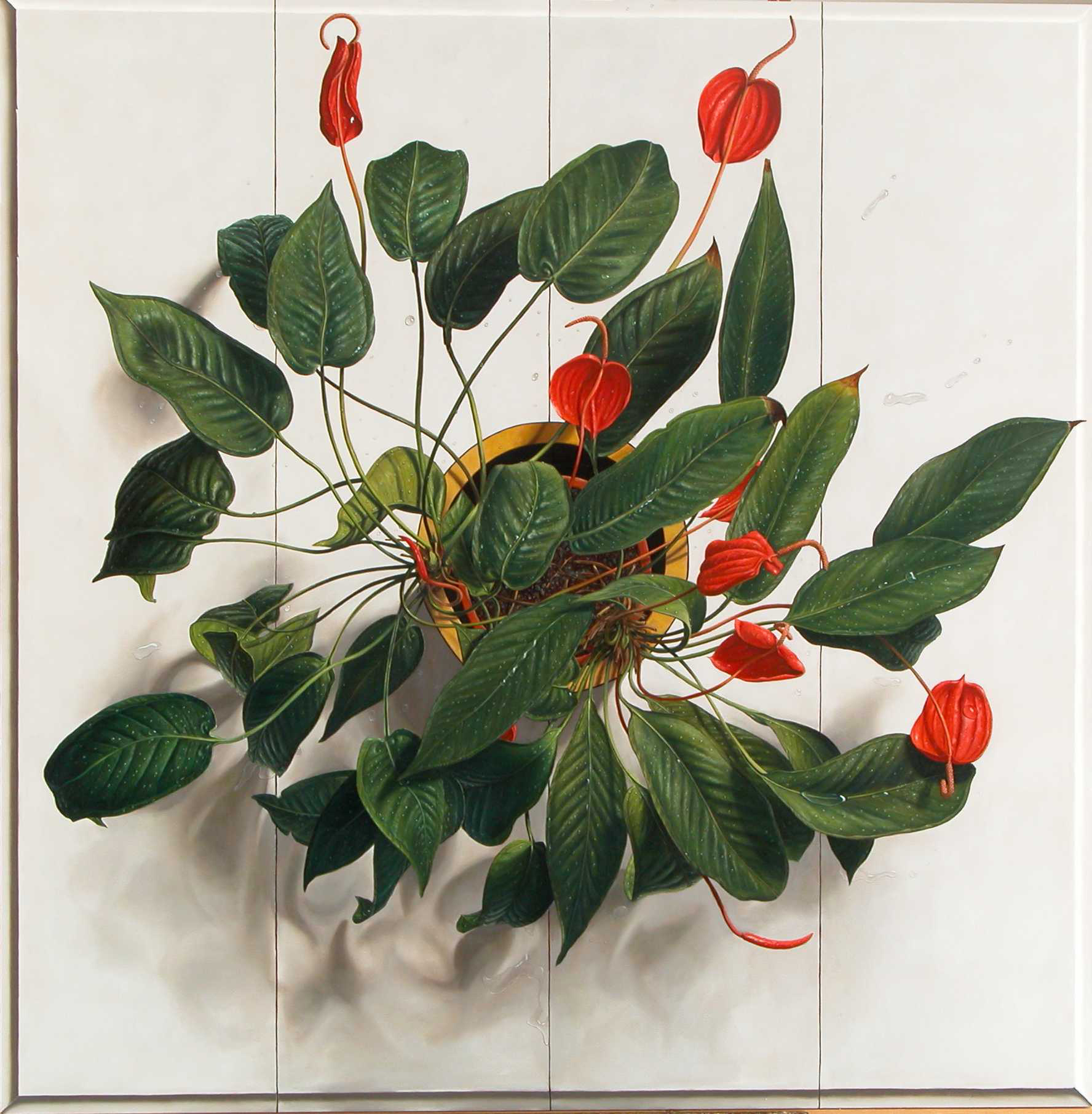
Yes, I'll fetch a cloth (1997). Example of "Top-down painting"

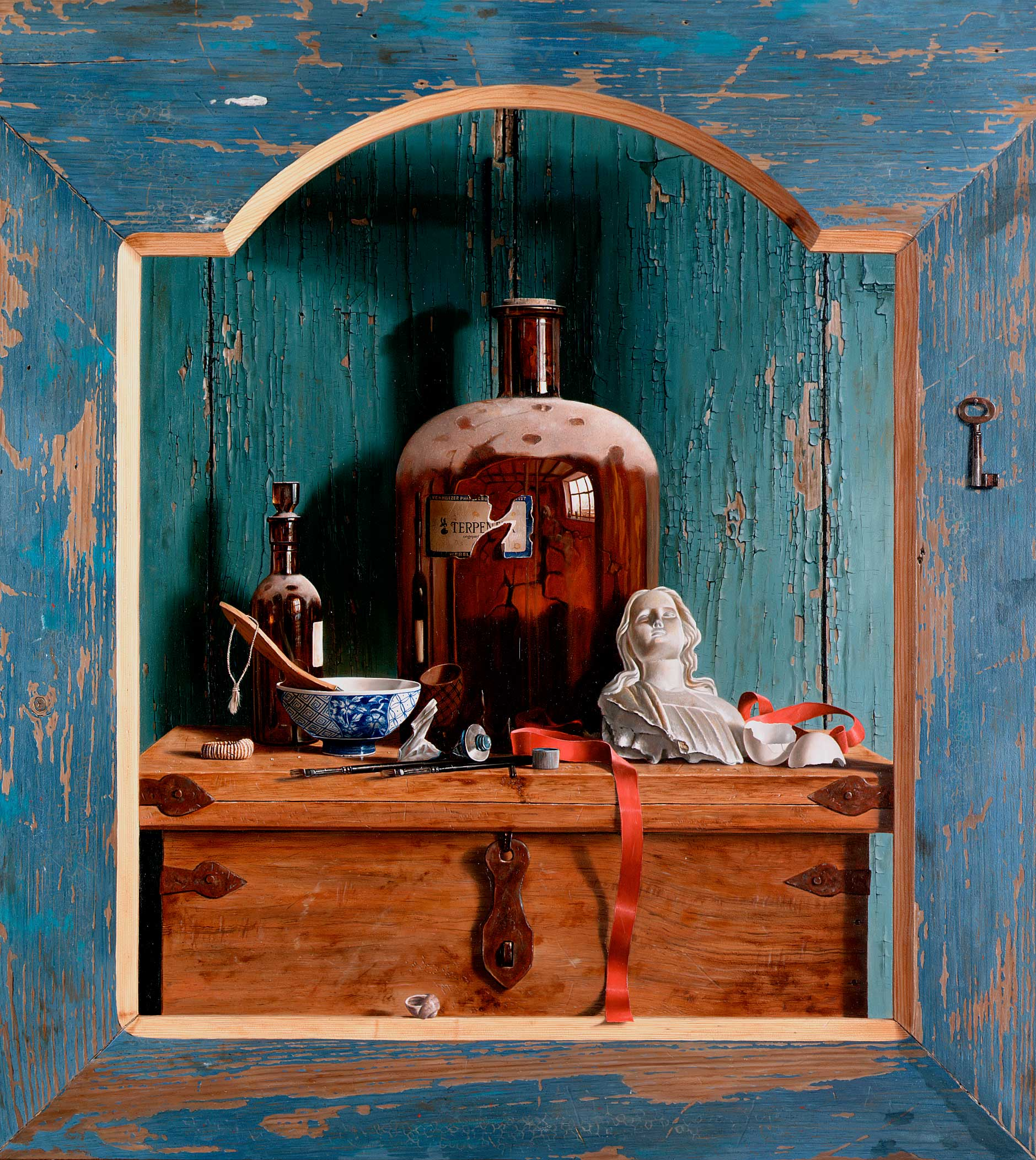
Craquelé (2001). ’’Craquelé’’ (2001). Painting from the series "Framed"

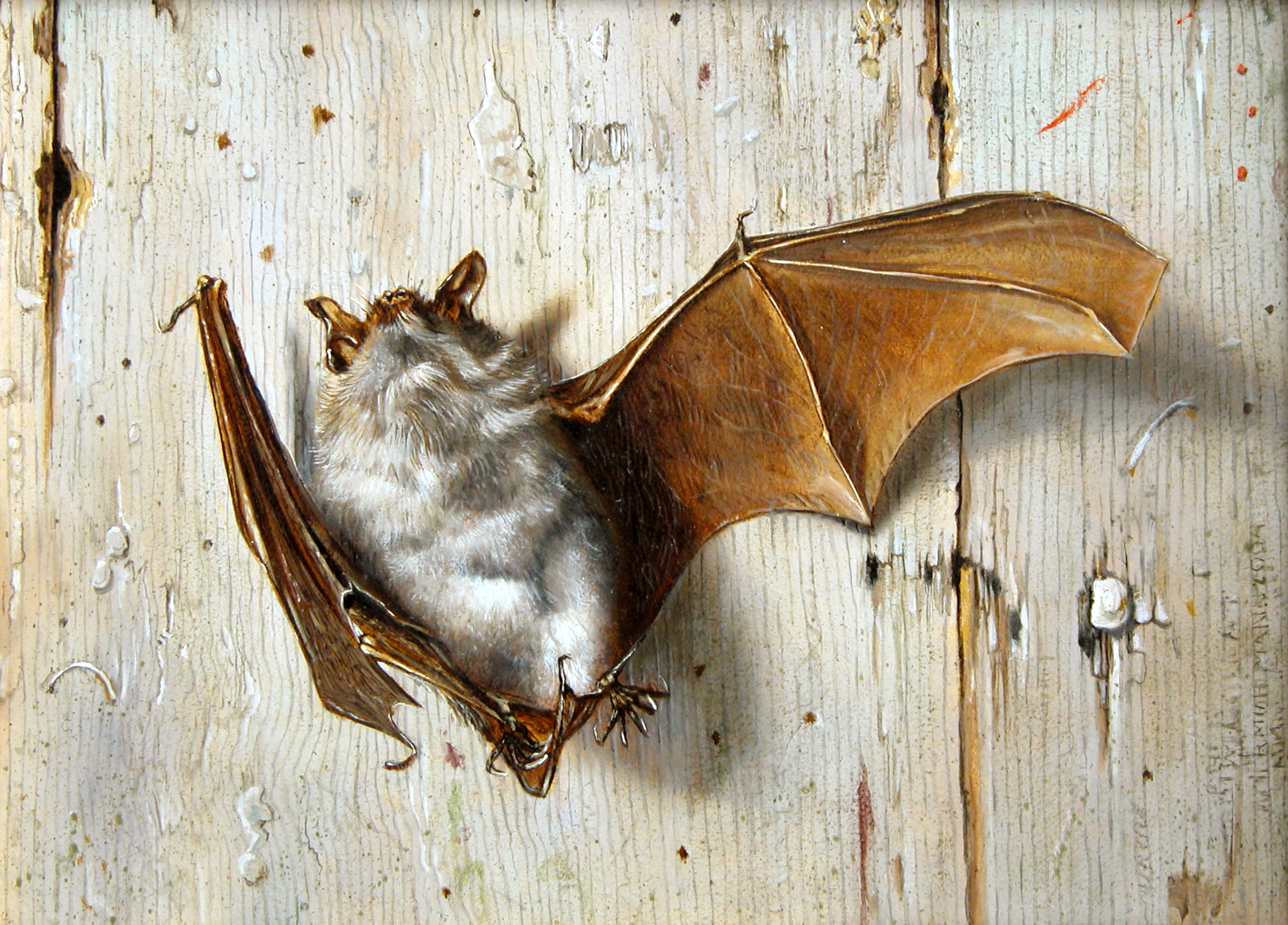
Dead bat (2004). Example of dead animal painting

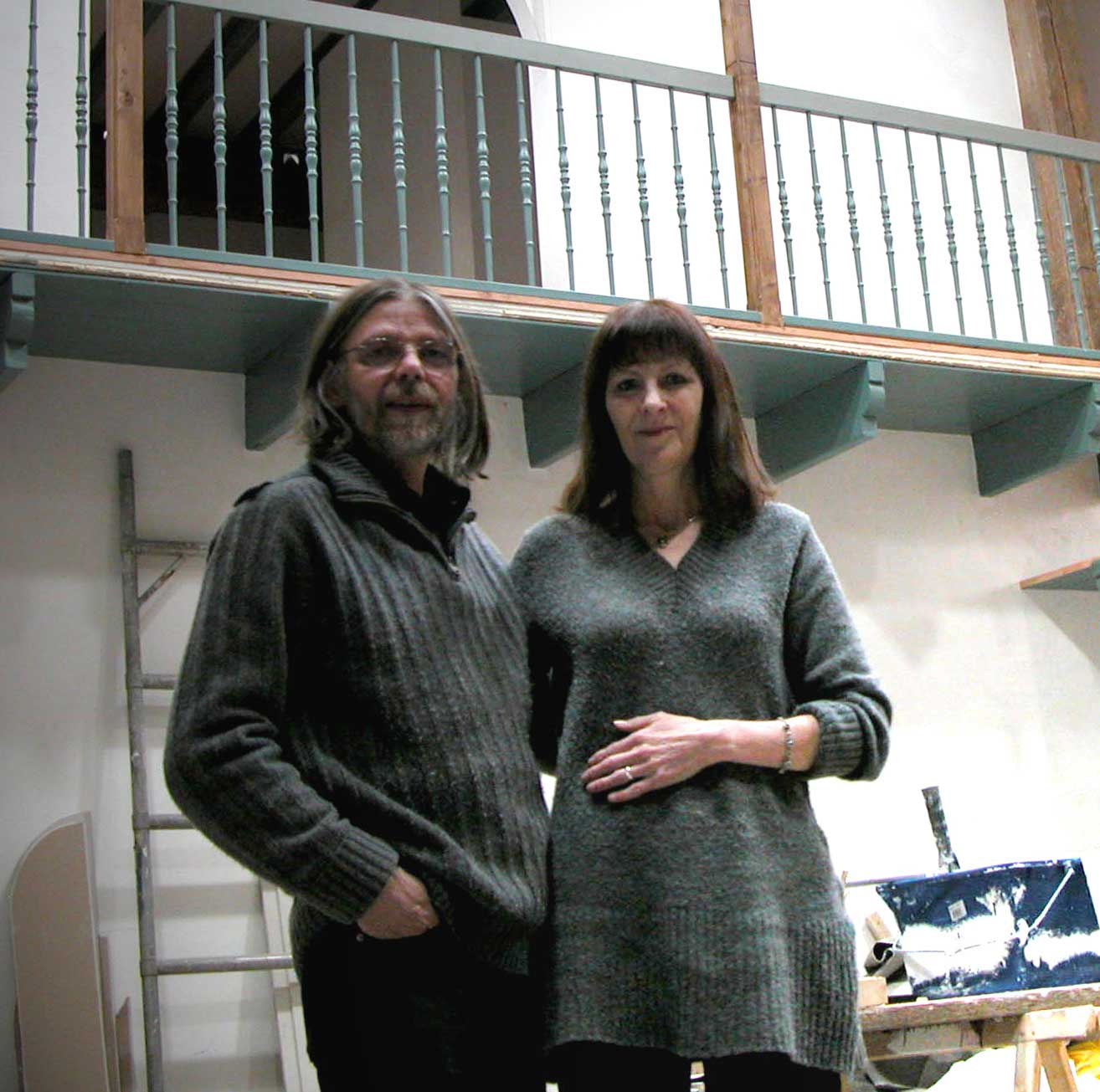
Rob and Laura Møhlmann (2008)

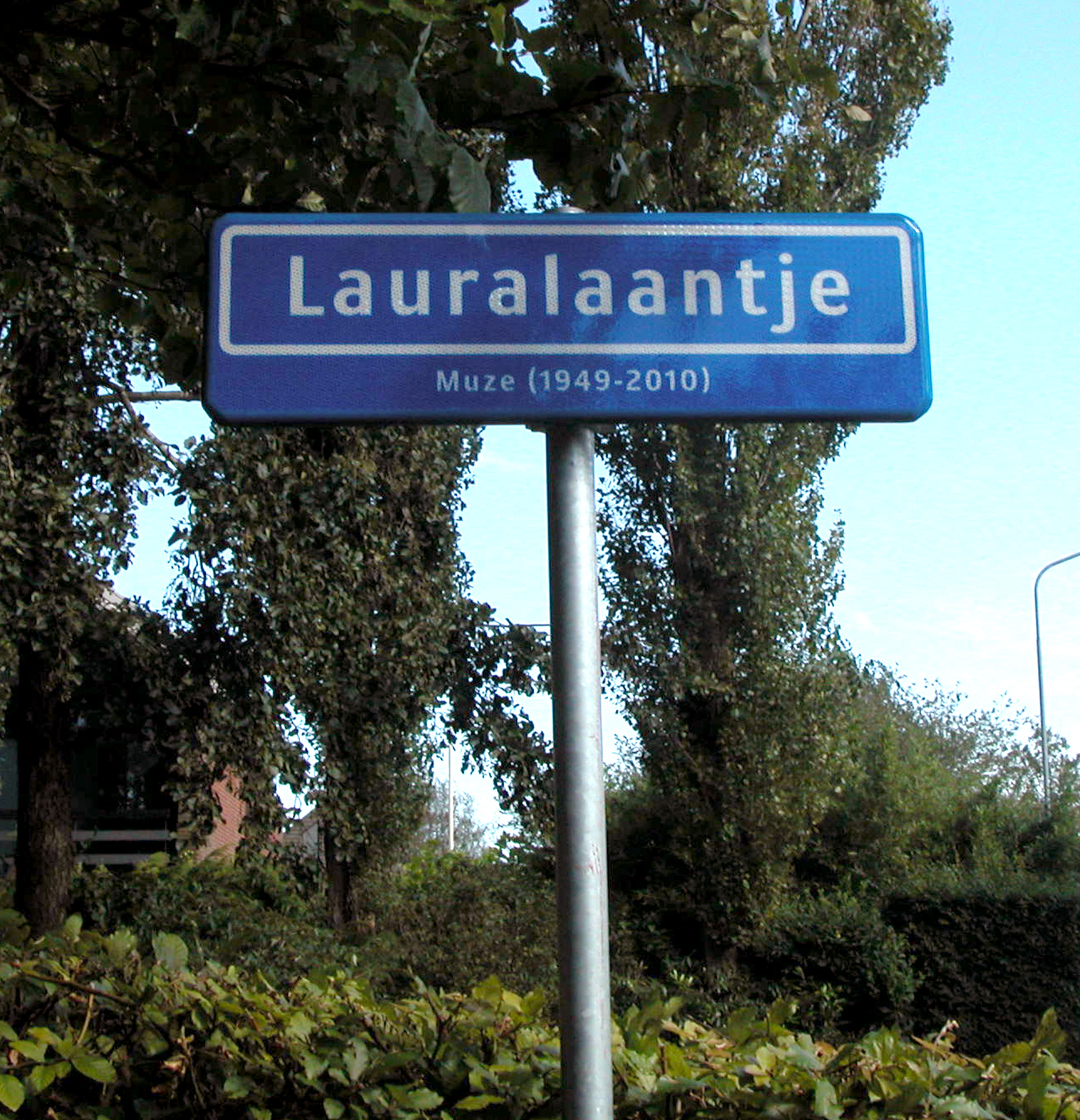
Lauralane, leading to entrance museum

In 1981 he painted, for the first time, the same still life from three different angles, as well as the same still life from four angles (opposite sides). His goal was to enforce a more realistic view of the objects. Henceforth Møhlmann consistently painted 1:1, i.e. the actual size of the object as seen. During the eighties the painter began a number of projects and series. One of them being the so-called Cantoproject (later called the Canto Collection), which could very well be considered his "magnum opus" and comprises the period 1982–1993. It has the subtitle "a glance at reality", and includes 124 paintings. All paintings have the same size and always show one and the same tin can (of the fictitious brand Canto) at the same place in the painting. Furthermore, the tin has always been depicted in the same size and is perceived at the same angle. Due to the constantly changing environment of the can, the series as a whole grew into a kind of pictorial adventure within the context of (seemingly) everyday reality. He also produced the series ‘Damaged’ or ‘Destroyed Canvasses’, in which the illusion is created that the canvas is torn or damaged. During 1984 he worked on ‘The Cube’ (‘A Contemporary Allegory’) for almost nine months. The work consists of 5 panels that together form a cabinet in which and on which all kinds of everyday objects are painted, often with a symbolic meaning. In 1985 the painter started with ‘The Balance Series’, in which he placed a still life on an empty canvas. Initially this was a single object, but over time increasingly complex stackings emerged.

=== Further development as an artist ===
During 1990 Møhlmann paints his first ‘Top-down painting’. This is a still life that is observed perpendicularly from above, with the vanishing point at the centre of the earth instead of on the horizon. He developed this method after an idea in Canto 86 ‘Ground pattern’, where the tin is seen lying on the ground. Møhlmann comes to the conclusion that in art there is the frog's and bird's-eye view, but not a line of sight from the zenith to the nadir. He calls this "falcon-perspective" and the work method "praying above the image". This, because he "floats" above his subject for a long time, in order to afterwards record it by heart in the painting. In 1993 Møhlmann paints the last Canto, because, in his own words, “he also needs to bring home the bacon”. The 124 paintings are one complete series and therefore not one Canto has ever been sold. In the years between 1993 and 2013, Møhlmann produces many still life paintings, with a predominant theme of dilapidation and decay of the objects. The painter tries to paint the objects as natural as possible. Møhlmann begins with another series called ‘Framed’ (dated between 1998 and 2002). He places a frame somewhere in his studio, seemingly at random, and then paints what can be seen within the frame. It is noticeable that during the years 2000-2013 many dead animals (birds, mice, frogs) appear in his work, often painted from various angles.

=== Phasing out of artists career ===
After the death of his wife and muse Laura Møhlmann, in 2010, Rob Møhlmann hardly paints anymore. Since 2010 only a handful of works left the artist's studio and he completed a few paintings which stood waiting, some of them for ten years. One of the last paintings is Broken Blue in which a self-portrait is combined with a very early drawing of Laura Møhlmann together with a still life of a broken blue bowl. After this he focuses mainly on the further development of Museum Møhlmann.

Rob Møhlmann was awarded Damster of the Year in 2014 and Knight of the Order of Orange-Nassau in 2017. Museum Møhlmann successively received the public award in 2017 and 2018: the Golden Museum Discovery Award.

== Autonomy and style ==
Although he works as a painter in the realistic tradition, specialized in still life painting, he does not belong to any particular school of thought or movement. Rather, he sees himself primarily as an independent realist painter. His work is characterized by the everyday nature of his subject matter, executed with great precision and a virtuoso expression of surface matter. In the field of still life painting he has contributed to (sometimes literally), new visual compositional angles and a fresh, different approach. With this he has blown new life into the old-fashioned image of still life painting.

Diederik Kraaijpoel, artist and advocate of figurative art, wrote: "His work is painted with a dissecting knife. (....) The object is disassembled and reconstructed. This is not merely about observing, but also seeking to understand what the world is made of. Therefore the objects are immersed in an immense feeling of intensity. It is as if the objects are charged with meaning, something they do not possess of themselves. Therein, and not only in the stories, lies the ‘magical’."

Rob Møhlmann is a self-taught painter. He has developed himself autonomously in terms of technique and style, but also conceptually. Therefore, it is hard to detect any external influences in his work. Diederik Kraaijpoel wrote about Møhlmann’s painting: "We are reminded of the Flemish Primitives (...)." One of the most famous Flemish Primitives, Jan van Eyck, appears in Møhlmann's work as early as 1984 on a painted cube to which legs are attached thus transforming it into a table. Top right, in the "fourth plane" of The Cube, part of the painting Man with the Red Turban, is to be seen. This was presumably a self-portrait of Jan van Eyck.

Man with the Red Turban (1433, presumably self-portrait Jan van Eyck)

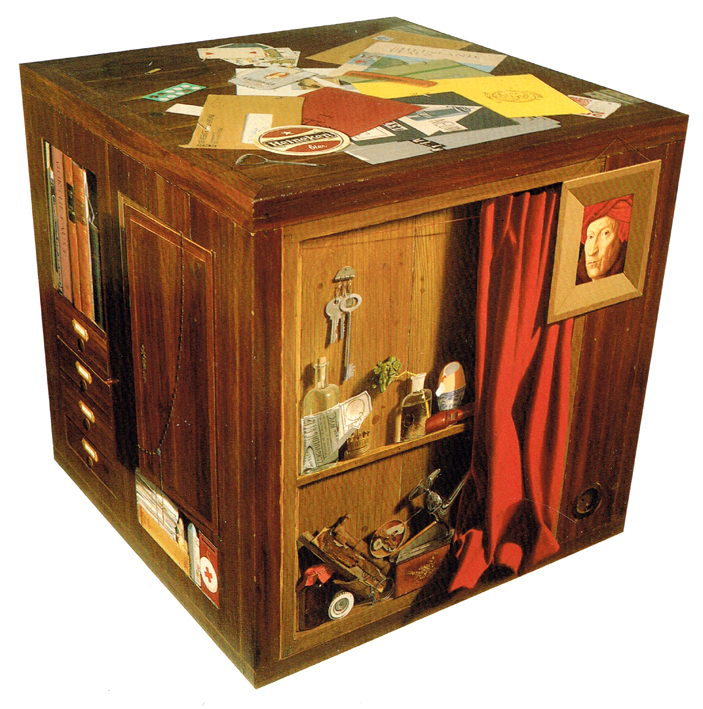
The Cube (1984–85), with above-right portrait of Jan van Eyck

Møhlmann has a number of things in common with Van Eyck, such as the fascination for reflections, an in-depth observation of details and an exquisite expression of the paint surface. Detailed reflections, as can be seen in the mirror in the background of Van Eyck's ‘Portrait of Giovanni Arnolfini and his wife’ (1434), are also common in Møhlmann's work. An example of this is the reflection in the Christmas ball in the painting ‘Holland’ (1985) where we can see the painter at work behind his easel as well as the window (with curtain) through which light enters.

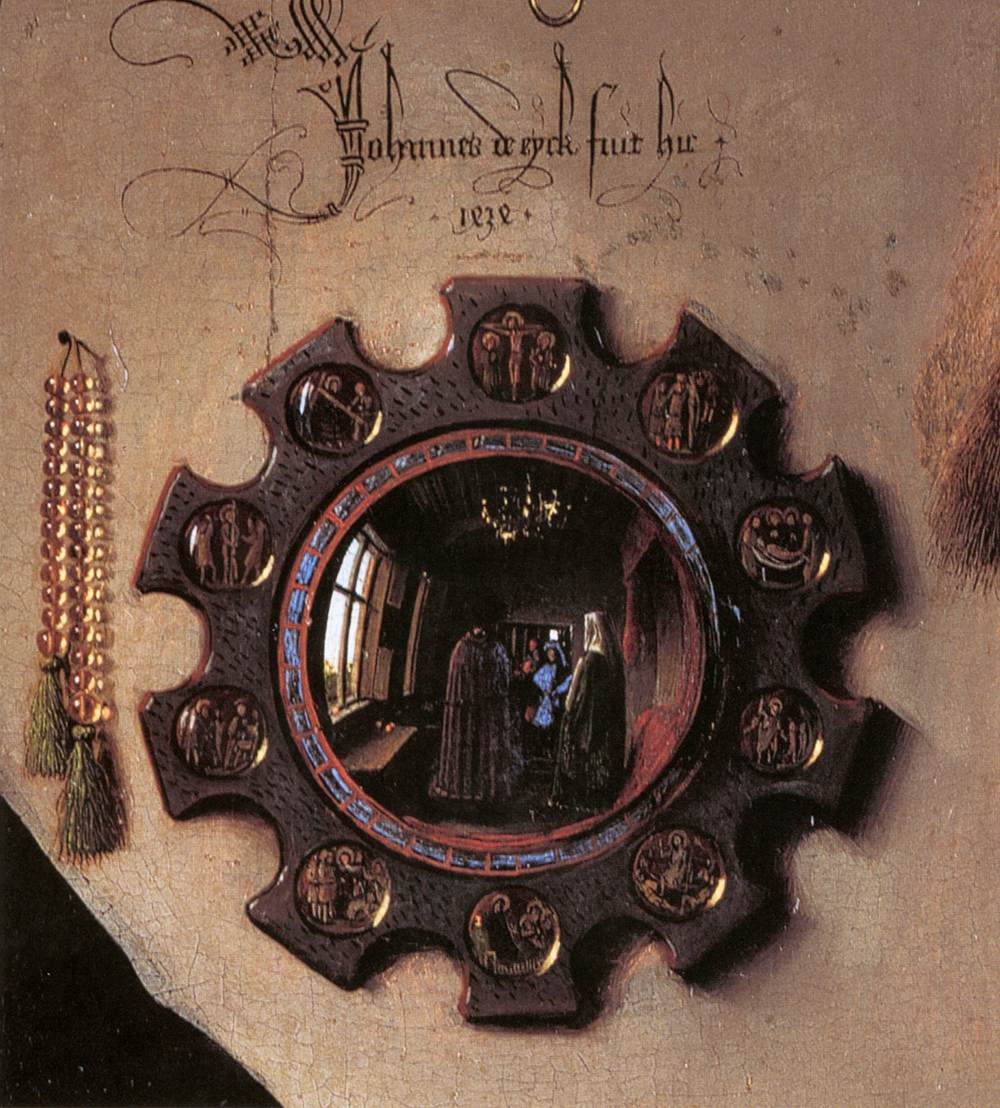
Van Eyck, detail

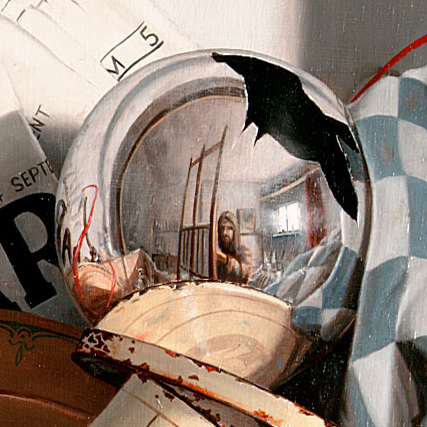
Rob Møhlmann, detail

In the speech Møhlmann gave in 2017 after receiving his royal decoration, he referred to the "loneliness" of the painter. In particular he mentioned Dick Ket, who, in the course of his short life, increasingly withdrew from public life. In his paintings Ket progressively focused solely on a few objects found around his house. These he rendered in razor-sharp still life paintings, working from a completely innovative "bird’s-eye view". With this he is a forerunner of Møhlmann, who takes this perspective even further by arriving at the so-called "falcon-perspective" observed perpendicularly from above. This resulted in Møhlmann creating a series of paintings called ‘Top-down paintings’.

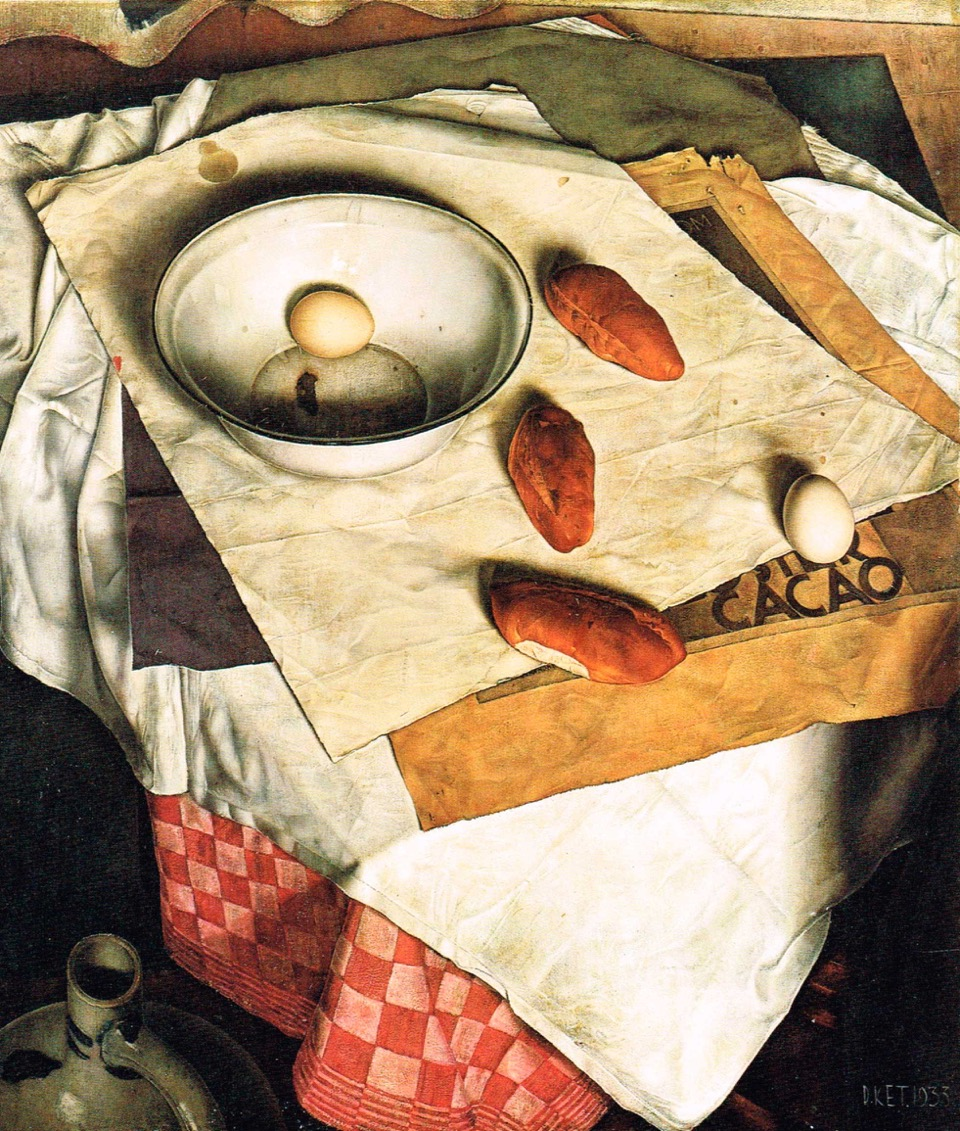
Dick Ket Still life with bread rolls, (1935) in bird-perspective

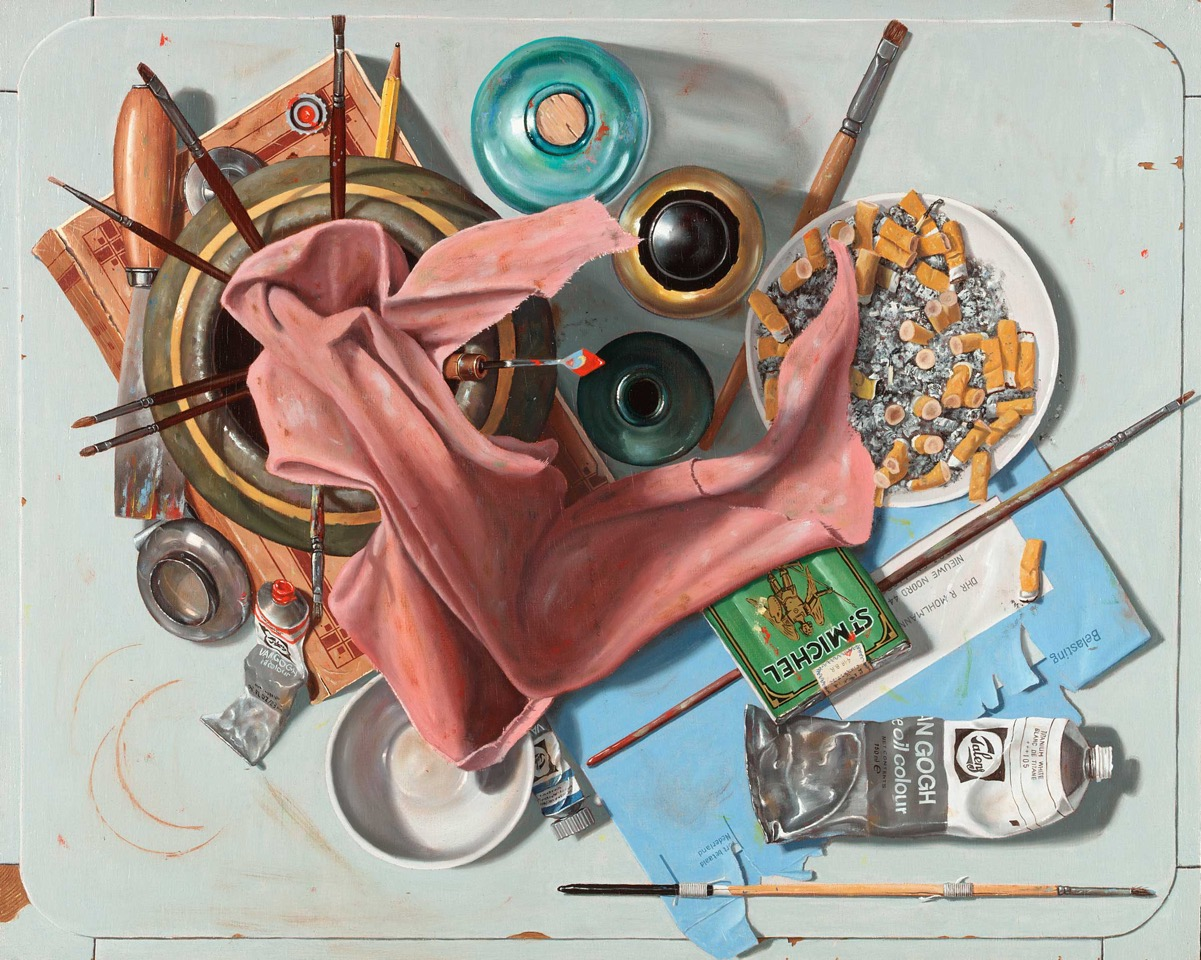
Rob Møhlmann Painterstable, (1990) in falcon-perspective

As well as an unusual perspective, Møhlmann and Dick Ket share an intensity of depiction, giving the still life objects a magical aura. Yet, with Møhlmann this cannot be called magical realism, because there is no other or higher reality present, let alone a hallucinatory or dreamlike world. Here reality is "exclusively" represented, although, due to the intensity of the paintings, we are able to perceive much more than everyday reality. Over time Møhlmann developed new ideas which resulted in a number of longer and shorter series, such as the 'Canto collection', the 'Balance series', the 'Framed series' and the 'Top-down paintings'. Rob Møhlmann could therefore be classified as a "conceptual realist".

Next to his work as a painter, he also became a staunch advocate of realism and figuration. Completely against the spirit of the times, he defended figurative art in word and deed. From 1998 onward he continued this crusade by starting his own museum with yearly exhibitions and publications. In its 20-year existence, Museum Møhlmann has become a nationally recognized platform for figurative art. An important yearly event is the Independent Realists' Exhibition (ORT - since 1998). The museum also houses a collection of contemporary figurative art, a collection of medieval art, 16th and 17th century prints, work and letters by Jan Mankes (1889–1920), work by Møhlmann's grandfather, J. C. Busé (1891–1974) and work by the painter himself.

== Museum ==
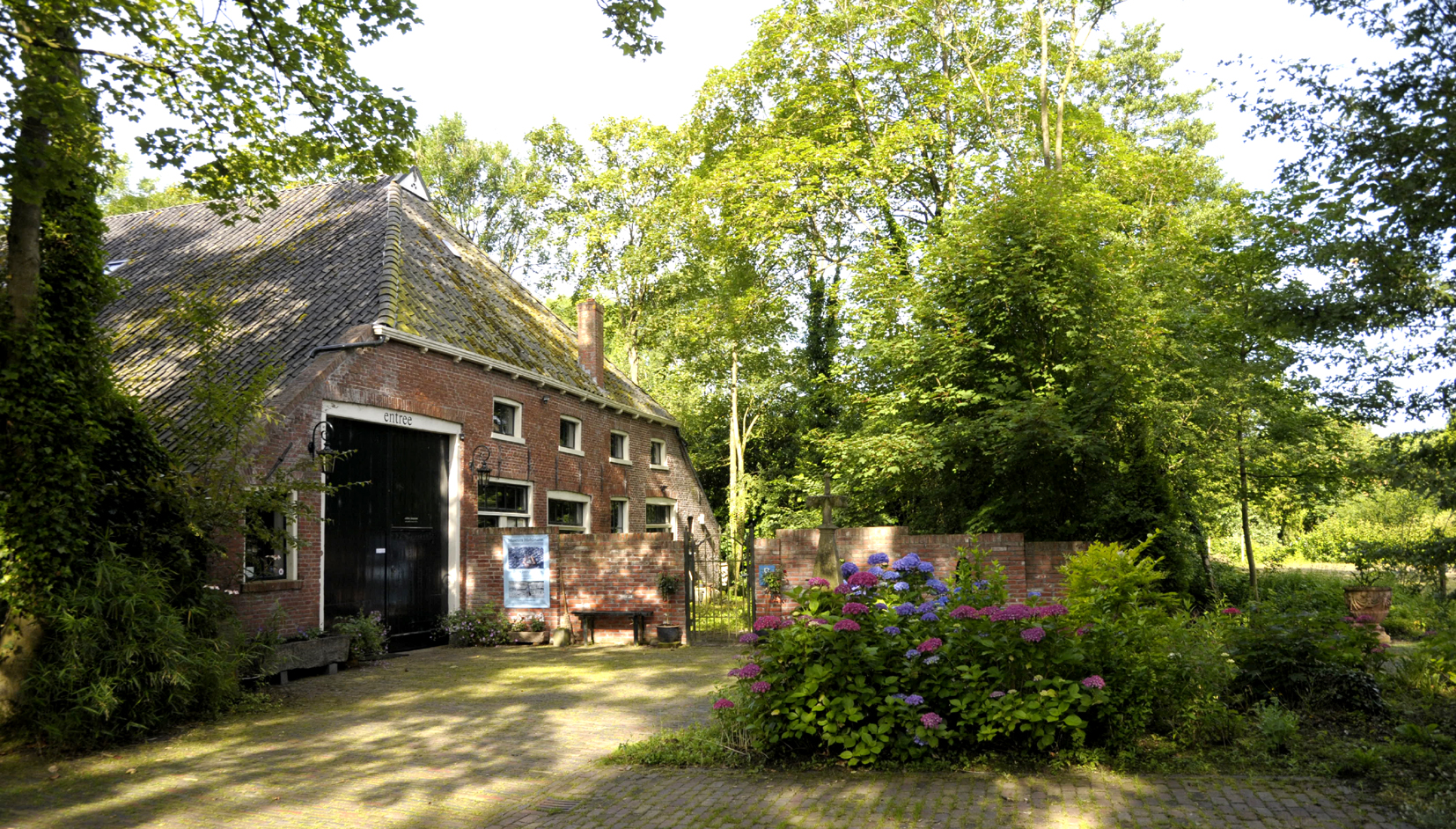
Entrance Museum Møhlmann

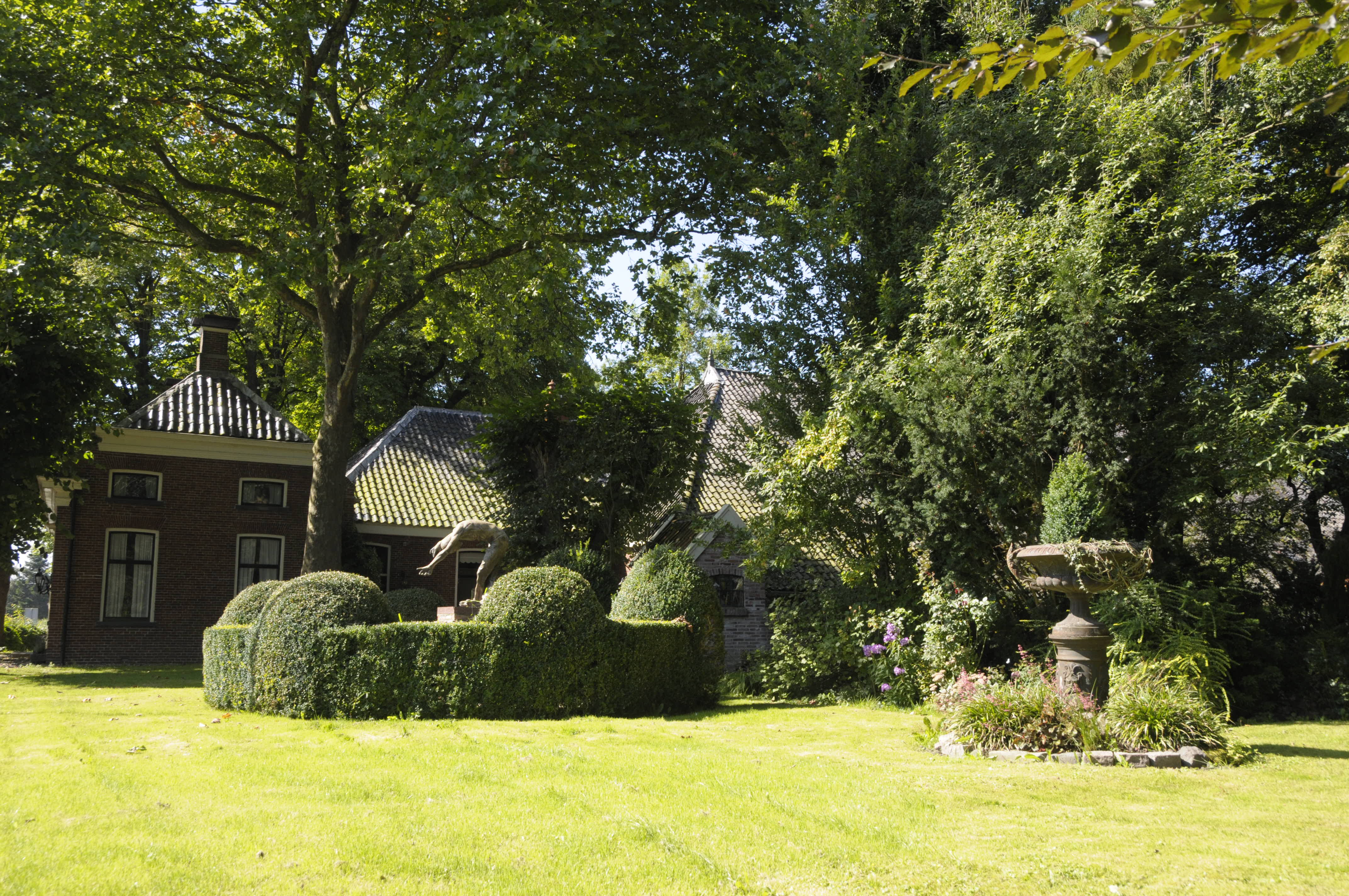
Sculpture garden Museum Møhlmann

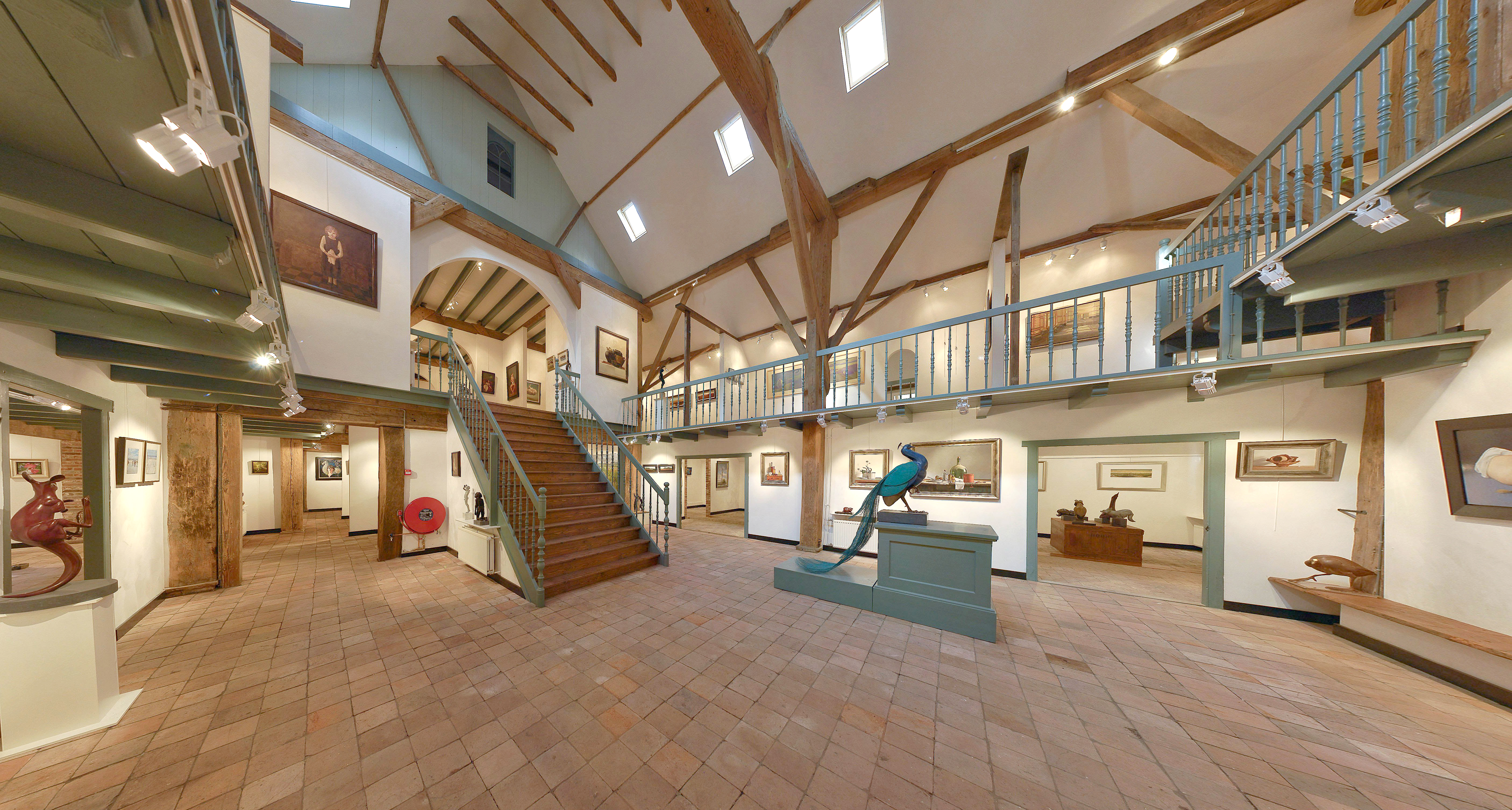
Interior Museum Møhlmann

== See also ==
- Museum Møhlmann
