= List of XML markup languages =

This is a list of notable XML markup languages.

== A ==
- AdsML Markup language used for interchange of data between advertising systems.
- aecXML: a mark-up language which uses Industry Foundation Classes to create a vendor-neutral means to access data generated by Building Information Modeling.
- AFrame: a mark-up language to create 3D graphics on web pages **.
- AgcXML
- Agricultural Ontology Service
- AIML Markup language used for creating artificial intelligence chatterbots.
- AnIML Markup language used for data created by scientific analytical instruments.
- ARXML Autosar specification description XML
- Atom (standard): The Atom Syndication Format is a language used for web feeds
- Attention Profiling Mark-up Language (APML): format for capturing a person's interests and dislikes
- Automated Test Markup Language (ATML): defines a standard exchange medium for sharing information between components of automatic test systems.
- Attention.xml: used for RSS and similar online subscription-tracking applications

== B ==
- BeerXML: a free XML based data description standard for the exchange of brewing data
- Binary Format Description language: an extension of XSIL which has added conditionals and the ability to reference files by their stream numbers, rather than by their public URLs
- Biological Dynamics Markup Language (BDML) is an XML format for quantitative data describing biological dynamics.
- Business Intelligence Markup Language (BIML) is an XML dialect for defining business intelligence (BI) assets.
- Business Process Execution Language: a business process modeling language that is executable

== C ==
- Call Control eXtensible Markup Language: a standard designed to provide telephony support to VoiceXML
- CCTRL: a call control XML that allows developers to create telephony services that run on Lignup, Inc.'s software communications platform
- CellML: a language describing mathematical models
- Channel Definition Format
- Chemical Markup Language
- ClaML : Classification Markup Language for health informatics, accepted as European Norm EN 14463:2007.
- Clinical Data Interchange Standards Consortium
- Clinical Document Architecture
- COLLADA: a standard for exchanging digital assets among various graphics software applications
- Common Alerting Protocol (CAP)
- CpML: Commodity products Markup Language. Used to describe products in wholesale energy and commodity trading.
- CXML: a protocol intended for communication of business documents between procurement applications, e-commerce hubs and suppliers
- CityGML: An open standardised data model and exchange format to store digital 3D models of cities and landscapes.

== D ==
- Darwin Information Typing Architecture (DITA): A document format used by publishers
- Data center markup language
- Data Format Description Language
- Digital Forensics XML
- Dimensional Markup Language
- Directory Service Markup Language
- DisplayML
- DocBook: a markup language for technical documentation.
- Document Schema Definition Languages
- Document Structure Description: a schema language for XML

== E ==
- EAC: Encoded Archival Context
- EAD: Encoded Archival Description
- ebXML: a collection of electronic business specifications
- eLML: eLesson Markup Language
- EMML Enterprise Mashup Markup Language
- Emotion Markup Language
- EPPML: Extensible Postal Product Model and Language
- EPUB: electronic publication, open e-book format
- Extensible Application Markup Language
- Extensible Data Format
- Extensible Messaging and Presence Protocol
- Extensible Provisioning Protocol
- Extensible Resource Identifier
- Extensible Stylesheet Language

== F ==
- Facelets VDL: View declaration language used in the Facelets framework and JavaServer Faces.
- FicML: Fiction Markup Language
- FictionBook: an e-book format
- FIXatdl, FIX algorithmic trading definition language. Schema provides a HCI between a human trader, the order entry screen(s), unlimited different algorithmic trading types (called strategies) from a variety of sources, and formats a new order message on the FIX wire.
- FIXML, Financial Information eXchange (FIX) protocol in XML format. FIX is a very widely deployed messaging protocol used between financial traders worldwide.
- FleXML: an XML transformation language
- FpML, Financial products Markup Language. Used to describe complex financial products.
- FundsXML: an open XML standard for exchanging investment fund data such as fund master data, prices, portfolio holdings and regulatory reporting between asset managers, custodians, distributors, data vendors and supervisors.
- FXT: transformation specification for the Functional XML Transformation Tool

== G ==
- Geography Markup Language: a grammar defined by the Open Geospatial Consortium (OGC) to express geographical features
- GeoSciML: a GML Application Schema that can be used to transfer information about geology, with an emphasis on the "interpreted geology" that is conventionally portrayed on geologic maps.
- GJXDM: a data reference model for the exchange of information within the justice and public safety communities
- GPX: a language designed for transferring GPS data between software applications
- GraphML: a standard exchange format for graphs
- Green Building XML: also known as "gbXML", a schema to facilitate the transfer of building properties stored in 3D building information models (BIM) to engineering analysis tools, especially energy and building performance analysis
- General Station Description Markup Language (GSDML): used to describe the communication interface of a Profinet device
- GuideML
- GXA: an extension of SOAP being worked on by Microsoft, IBM and some other developers
- GXL: a standard exchange format for graphs

== H ==
- HumanML: for describing contextual (emotional, social, pragmatic) information about instances of human communication

== I ==
- Industry Foundation Classes: specifically the "ifcXML" format, defined by ISO 10303-28 ("STEP-XML"), having file extension ".ifcXML". This format is suitable for interoperability with XML tools and exchanging partial building models.
- Information and Content Exchange
- IO Device Description (IODD): contains information about the device's identity, parameters, process data, diagnosis data and IO-Link communication properties.

== J ==
- JATS: a vocabulary used for the preparation and publication of scholarly articles.
- Java Speech Markup Language: a language for annotating text input to speech synthesizers.
- Job Definition Format: a standard developed by the graphic arts industry to facilitate cross-vendor workflow implementations
- Job Submission Description Language: describes simple tasks to non-interactive computer execution systems

== K ==
- Keyhole Markup Language: geographic annotation

== L ==
- LandXML: a file format for the exchange of civil engineering and land survey data
- Link contract
- LOGML: Log Markup Language, for describing the log reports of web servers

== M ==
- MARCXML: a schema developed by the Library of Congress to enable the sharing and accessing of bibliographic information
- MathML: a language describing mathematical notation
- Medical Reality Markup Language (MRML)
- Metadata Object Description Schema: an XML schema with bibliographic elements used for a variety of library applications
- Metalink: metadata file format to describe one or more computer files available for download.
- Microformats: a piece mark up that allows expression of semantics in an HTML (or XHTML) web page
- MOWL: semantic interactions with multimedia content
- Music Encoding Initiative (MEI): an XML-based language for digital representations of music notation documents.
- Music Markup Language
- MusicXML: an XML-based music notation file format.
- MXML: a language used to declaratively lay-out the interface of applications, and also to implement complex business logic and rich internet application behaviors

== N ==
- Namespace-based Validation Dispatching Language
- National Information Exchange Model
- Nested Context Language
- NewsML: provides a media-independent, structural framework for multi-media news (Superseded by NewsML-G2)
- NewsML-G2: an XML multimedia news exchange format standard of the IPTC, the International Press Telecommunications Council
- NeXML: an XML representation of the NeXus data format
- NeuroML: computational neuroscience models

== O ==
- ODD: A 'One Document Does-it-all' TEI format for simultaneously recording project documentation and meta-schema definition from which you can generate RELAX NG, W3C XML Schema, and DTDs as well as formatted documentation.
- ODRL: an XML-based standard Rights Expression Language (REL) used in digital rights management systems
- Office Open XML: is a Microsoft file format specification for the storage of electronic documents
- OFX: Open Financial Exchange is a unified specification for the electronic exchange of financial data between financial institutions, businesses and consumers via the Internet.
- OIOXML: an XML-markup language created by the Danish government to ease communication from, to and between Danish governmental instances
- Open Mathematical Documents (OMDoc), based on OpenMath and MathML, but with a greater coverage.
- OML: an XML format for outlines, based on OPML.
- Open eBook: the e-book format defined by Open eBook Publication Structure Specification; superseded by ePub.
- Open Scripture Information Standard (OSIS), an XML-markup schema that defines tags for marking up Bibles, theological commentaries, and other related literature.
- OpenDocument (ODF): a document file format used for describing electronic documents
- OpenMath – a markup language for mathematical formulae which can complement MathML.
- OPML: an XML format for outlines

== P ==
- phyloXML – XML for phylogenetic and phylogenomic applications
- PMML – XML for predictive analytics and data mining
- PNML – Petri Net Markup Language
- PreTeXt – An authoring and publishing system for authors of textbooks, research articles, and monographs, especially in mathematics and other STEM disciplines.
- PDBML – XML for Protein Data Bank

== Q ==
- QuakeML – Quake Markup Language, an extensible and modular XML representation of seismological data

== R ==
- RailML: language for interoperability in railway industry applications.
- RDFa
- RecipeML
- Regular Language description for XML
- RELAX NG: a schema language
- Remote Telescope Markup Language
- Resource Description Framework: a metadata model based upon the idea of making statements about web resources
- RoadXML: file format for driving simulator database.
- RSS (file format)
- RSS enclosure
- RuleML: a markup language for rules

== S ==
- S1000D: “International specification for technical publications using a common source database”, is an international specification for the production of technical publications.
- S5 file format: slideshow data
- SAML: authentication and authorization data
- SBML: models of biological processes
- SBGN: graphical representation of cellular processes and biological networks
- Schematron: an XML structure validation language for making assertions about the presence or absence of patterns in trees
- SCORM: XML for web-based e-learning
- SCXML: provides a generic state-machine based execution environment based on Harel statecharts
- Simple Sharing Extensions
- SMIL: Synchronized Multimedia Integration Language describes multimedia presentations
- SOAP: a protocol for exchanging XML-based messages over computer networks
- SOAP with Attachments: the method of using Web Services to send and receive files using a combination of SOAP and MIME, primarily over HTTP.
- Speech Application Language Tags
- Speech Synthesis Markup Language: a language for speech synthesis applications
- SPML: user, resource and service provisioning information
- Strategy Markup Language (StratML): an XML vocabulary and schema for strategic and performance plans and reports
- Streaming Transformations for XML: a XML transformation language intended as a high-speed, low memory consumption alternative to XSLT.
- SVG: Scalable Vector Graphics
- SXBL: defines the presentation and interactive behavior of elements described in SVG

== T ==
- Text Encoding Initiative – guidelines for text encoding, with schemas and a mechanism to customise to individual project needs.
- ThML – Theological Markup Language created by Christian Classics Ethereal Library (CCEL), to create electronic theological texts.
- Topicmaps
- TransducerML – Open Geospatial Consortium language for describing sensors and their output
- Translation Memory eXchange (TMX): translation memory data
- TREX: a simple schema language

== U ==
- Unified XUL Platform: a 2017 fork of XUL.
- UIML: User Interface Markup Language
- Universal Business Language: an open library of standard electronic XML business documents developed by OASIS (organization)
- Universal Description Discovery and Integration: a registry for businesses worldwide to list themselves on the Internet

== V ==
- Vector Markup Language: used to produce vector graphics, implemented in Microsoft Office 2000 and higher
- VoiceXML: format for specifying interactive voice dialogues between a human and a computer

== W ==
- W3C MMI
- WDDX: Web Distributed Data eXchange
- WaterML: standard information model for the representation of water observations data, with the intent of allowing the exchange of such data sets across information systems.
- Web feed
- Web Ontology Language: a language for defining and instantiating Web ontologies (a set of concepts within a domain and the relationships between those concepts)
- Web Services Description Language: an XML-based language that provides a model for describing Web services
- Web Services Dynamic Discovery: a technical specification that defines a multicast discovery protocol to locate services on a local network.
- Wellsite information transfer standard markup language
- WML Wireless Markup Language
- WiX: Windows installers data
- WordprocessingML: a file format specification for the storage of electronic documents
- WS-Policy

== X ==
- X3D: Extensible 3D (X3D) is an international standard for real-time 3D computer graphics, the successor to Virtual Reality Modeling Language (VRML)
- XAML: is a declarative XML-based language that Microsoft developed for initializing structured values and objects.
- XACML: eXtensible Access Control Markup Language
- XBEL : the XML Bookmark Exchange Language.
- XBL: used to declare the behavior and look of 'XUL'-widgets and XML elements
- XBRL: an open data standard for financial reporting.
- xCBL: a collection of XML specifications for use in e-business.
- xCal: the XML-compliant representation of the iCalendar standard
- XCES: an XML based standard to codify text corpus
- XDI: sharing, linking, and synchronizing data using machine-readable structured documents that use an RDF vocabulary based on XRI structured identifiers
- XDuce: an XML transformation language
- XDXF: for monolingual and bilingual dictionaries
- XFA: enhance the processing of web forms
- XForms: a format for the specification of a data processing model for XML data and user interface(s) for the XML data, such as web forms
- XHTML: a markup language that has the same depth of expression as HTML, but with a syntax conforming to XML
- XHTML Basic
- XHTML Friends Network
- XHTML Modularization
- XidML: an open standard used within the flight test instrumentation industry that describes instrumentation and how data is acquired, stored, transmitted and processed
- XInclude: a processing model and syntax for general purpose XML inclusion
- XLIFF: XML Localization Interchange File Format, a format created to standardize localization.
- XLink: a language used for creating hyperlinks in XML documents
- XMI: an OMG standard for exchanging metadata information via XML. The most common use of XMI is as an interchange format for UML models
- XML Encryption: a specification that defines how to encrypt the content of an XML element
- XML Information Set: describing an abstract data model of an XML document in terms of a set of information items
- XML Interface for Network Services: definition and implementation of internet applications, enforcing a specification-oriented approach.
- XML Resource: provide a platform independent way of describing windows in a GUI
- XML Schema: a description of a type of XML document, typically expressed in terms of constraints on the structure and content of documents of that type, above and beyond the basic syntax constraints imposed by XML itself
- XML Script: an XML transformation language, or a Microsoft technology preview for scripting web browsers
- XML Signature: an XML syntax for digital signatures
- XML for Analysis: data access in analytical systems, such as OLAP and Data Mining
- XML pipeline: a language expressing how XML transformations are connected together
- XML-RPC: a remote procedure call protocol which uses XML to encode its calls and HTTP as a transport mechanism
- XMLTerm: A Mozilla-based Semantic User Interface
- XMLTV: a format to represent TV listings.
- XOMGL: obtain large amounts of data from municipal government agencies.
- XOXO: an XML microformat for publishing outlines, lists, and blogrolls on the Web
- XPDL: interchange Business Process definitions between different workflow products
- XPath (or XPath 1.0): an expression language for addressing portions of an XML document
- XPath 2.0: a language for addressing portions of XML documents, successor of XPath 1.0
- XPointer: a system for addressing components of XML based internet media
- XProc : a W3C standard language to describe XML Pipeline
- XQuery: a query language designed to query collections of XML data (similar to SQL)
- XrML: the eXtensible Rights Markup Language, or the Rights Expression Language (REL) for MPEG-21
- XSIL: an XML-based transport language for scientific data
- XSL Formatting Objects: a markup language for XML document formatting which is most often used to generate PDFs
- XSL Transformations: a language used for the transformation of XML documents.
- XSPF: a playlist format for digital media
- XTCE: describes binary blocks for telemetry and command exchange
- XUL: a XML user interface markup language developed by the Mozilla project.
- XUpdate: a lightweight query language for modifying XML data
