= BPN =

BPN may refer to:

== In business, governments and organizations ==
- Banco Português de Negócios, a Portuguese bank
- Business Partner Network, a source for vendor data for the US federal government

== Places ==
- Babiogórski Park Narodowy
- Białowieski Park Narodowy
- Biebrzański Park Narodowy
- Bieszczadzki Park Narodowy

== Computing ==
- Business process network, a secure, distributed network service similar to a virtual private network
- An authority control identifier issued by the Dutch Biografisch Portaal

== Science ==
- Boron-potassium nitrate, a pyrotechnic initiator

== Transportation ==
- National Rail station code for Blackpool North railway station
- Sultan Aji Muhammad Sulaiman Sepinggan Airport, Balikpapan, Indonesia (IATA code)
