= Exchange to exchange =

Exchange to exchange (sometimes Exchange-to-exchange, abbreviated E2E) is integration, between certain pairs of computer systems. To qualify as E2E, each of the paired systems must have a primary use of acting as an exchange, or gateway, among its own customers.

A common example is a connection between stock brokerage firms' internal systems and systems of a stock market in which the broker trades. These connections are often facilitated by middleware services, such as object request brokers.

Each E2E partner system has a primary function to its own clients of allowing them to transfer information or conduct other transactions, This is a form of the business to business (B2B) commerce model, as each E2E partner is a B2B gateway for its clients, and in turn exchanges information with at least one other B2B gateway. The connection between the two B2B systems (exchanges) is then an exchange to exchange integration.

E2E is an alternative to direct application to application integration (A2A), though some A2A can be classified as E2E.
