= DCML =

DCML may refer to:

- Dorsal column-medial lemniscus pathway
- Data Center Markup Language
- INDUCKS - Disney comics mailing list
