= List of CEN technical committees =

This is a list of CEN Technical Committees.

The European Committee for Standardization (CEN) is one of three European standardisation organisations in the European Union, listed in ANNEX I of the Regulation (EU) No 1025/2012. Within the CEN, standards are drafted by Technical Committees (TCs) of particular scope on the basis of national participation by the CEN members, i.e. the National Standardization Bodies of the European Union member states and some additional European country.

The following Technical Committees exist or existed within CEN:

Technical Committee	Title	Created	Status (June 2015)
CEN/TC 1	Oil and gas pipelines; pipe requirements	03.11.1993	Disbanded
CEN/TC 2	Shipbuilding details	22.03.1991	Disbanded
CEN/TC 3	Kitchen equipment; functional dimensions	22.03.1991	Disbanded
CEN/TC 4	Definitions in the field of building	22.03.1991	Disbanded
CEN/TC 5	Building; architectural drawings	22.03.1991	Disbanded
CEN/TC 6	Building; prefabricated partitions, 'dry' partitions	22.03.1991	Disbanded
CEN/TC 7	Sanitary appliances	01.01.1962	Disbanded
CEN/TC 8	Plastic tubes and products for buildings	22.03.1991	Disbanded
CEN/TC 9	Banking	22.03.1991	Disbanded
CEN/TC 10	Lifts, escalators and moving walks	01.01.1962	Active
CEN/TC 11	Screw threads	22.03.1991	Active
CEN/TC 12	Materials, equipment and offshore structures for petroleum, petrochemical and natural gas industries	01.01.1993	Active
CEN/TC 13	Paper	22.03.1991	Disbanded
CEN/TC 14	Cables and accessories for lifts	22.03.1991	Disbanded
CEN/TC 15	Inland navigation vessels	01.01.1989	Active
CEN/TC 16	Basic standards. Drawing practice	22.03.1991	Disbanded
CEN/TC 17	Units of measurement	22.03.1991	Disbanded
CEN/TC 18	Steel	22.03.1991	Disbanded
CEN/TC 19	Gaseous and liquid fuels, lubricants and related products of petroleum, synthetic and biological origin.	01.01.1962	Active
CEN/TC 20	Textiles	22.03.1991	Disbanded
CEN/TC 21	Machine tools	22.03.1991	Disbanded
CEN/TC 22	Rubber	22.03.1991	Disbanded
CEN/TC 23	Transportable gas cylinders	01.01.1989	Active
CEN/TC 24	Steering Committee for building	02.05.1991	Disbanded
CEN/TC 25	Lengths of corrugated asbestos cement sheeting	22.03.1991	Disbanded
CEN/TC 26	Light metals and their alloys	22.03.1991	Disbanded
CEN/TC 27	Sizes of large building components	22.03.1991	Disbanded
CEN/TC 28	Building - pipes and fittings	01.01.1962	Disbanded
CEN/TC 29	Building; pipes, rubbish chutes, etc.	22.03.1991	Disbanded
CEN/TC 30	Building; tests, mineral materials	22.03.1991	Disbanded
CEN/TC 31	Building; tests, determination of thermal characteristics	22.03.1991	Disbanded
CEN/TC 32	Building, tests, determination of acoustic characteristics	22.03.1991	Disbanded
CEN/TC 33	Doors, windows, shutters, building hardware and curtain walling	01.01.1962	Active
CEN/TC 34	Water fittings and waste fittings for sanitary appliances - Dimensions - Quality	01.01.1968	Disbanded
CEN/TC 35	Building; woodwork, iron-mongery (dimensions, quality)	22.03.1991	Disbanded
CEN/TC 36	Valves and taps for water supply in buildings; dimensions; quality	28.03.1991	Disbanded
CEN/TC 37	Building; tile (quality)	22.03.1991	Disbanded
CEN/TC 38	Durability of wood and wood-based products	01.01.1962	Active
CEN/TC 39	Gears	22.03.1991	Disbanded
CEN/TC 40	Bolts, screws, nuts and accessories	28.03.1991	Disbanded
CEN/TC 41	Classification of non-ferrous metal scrap	22.03.1991	Disbanded
CEN/TC 42	Certification of products	22.03.1991	Disbanded
CEN/TC 43	Office furniture	01.01.1967	Disbanded
CEN/TC 44	Commercial and Professional Refrigerating Appliances and Systems, Performance and Energy Consumption	01.01.1967	Active
CEN/TC 45	Base sizes of sales units of textile goods	28.03.1991	Disbanded
CEN/TC 46	Fireplaces for liquid fuels	01.01.1968	Active
CEN/TC 47	Atomizing oil burners and their components - Function - Safety - Testing	01.01.1968	Active
CEN/TC 48	Domestic gas-fired water heaters	01.01.1969	Active
CEN/TC 49	Gas cooking appliances	01.01.1969	Active
CEN/TC 50	Lighting columns and spigots	01.01.1969	Active
CEN/TC 51	Cement and building limes	01.01.1973	Active
CEN/TC 52	Safety of toys	01.01.1969	Active
CEN/TC 53	Temporary works equipment	01.01.1970	Active
CEN/TC 54	Unfired pressure vessels	01.01.1971	Active
CEN/TC 55	Dentistry	01.01.1971	Active
CEN/TC 56	Dimensions of bed blankets	01.01.1971	Disbanded
CEN/TC 57	Central heating boilers	01.01.1971	Active
CEN/TC 58	Safety and control devices for burners and appliances burning gaseous or liquid fuels	01.01.1971	Active
CEN/TC 59	Refrigerated farm milk coolers	01.01.1971	Disbanded
CEN/TC 60	Workshop storage bins	22.03.1991	Disbanded
CEN/TC 61	Quantitative chemical analysis of textile fibre mixtures	28.03.1991	Disbanded
CEN/TC 62	Independent gas-fired space heaters	01.01.1971	Active
CEN/TC 63	Packages for washing and cleaning powders	01.01.1972	Disbanded
CEN/TC 64	Link chains	01.01.1972	Disbanded
CEN/TC 65	Standardization of safety requirements related to the mechanical design of portable grinding machines	01.01.1972	Disbanded
CEN/TC 66	Tests on glass fibre reinforced plastics	01.01.1972	Disbanded
CEN/TC 67	Ceramic tiles	01.01.1972	Active
CEN/TC 68	Builders' hoists for passenger and/or materials	01.01.1972	Disbanded
CEN/TC 69	Industrial valves	01.01.1989	Active
CEN/TC 70	Manual means of fire fighting equipment	01.01.1972	Active
CEN/TC 71	Application of the international system of units	28.03.1991	Disbanded
CEN/TC 72	Fire detection and fire alarm systems	01.01.1973	Active
CEN/TC 73	Methods of test for vehicle safety glass	28.03.1991	Disbanded
CEN/TC 74	Flanges and their joints	01.01.1972	Active
CEN/TC 75	Steel wire ropes	28.03.1991	Disbanded
CEN/TC 76	Design and construction of gas and oil pipelines	28.03.1991	Disbanded
CEN/TC 77	Drainage equipment (systems, design rules, coordination)	01.01.1973	Disbanded
CEN/TC 78	Capacities of glass jars for preserved fruit, vegetables and similar products	01.01.1973	Disbanded
CEN/TC 79	Respiratory protective devices	01.01.1974	Active
CEN/TC 80	Preparation for welding of pipes, valves and other fittings	22.03.1991	Disbanded
CEN/TC 81	Capacities of metal cans for fruit, vegetables and similar products	01.01.1974	Disbanded
CEN/TC 82	Technological tests for doors, fastenings and their building hardware	29.03.1991	Disbanded
CEN/TC 83	Technological tests for windows, fastenings and their building hardware	29.03.1991	Disbanded
CEN/TC 84	Lifting hooks	01.01.1985	Disbanded
CEN/TC 85	Eye protective equipment	01.01.1975	Active
CEN/TC 86	Baths and shower trays made from acrylic materials	01.01.1976	Disbanded
CEN/TC 87	Gas fuelled smokers lighters	01.01.1976	Disbanded
CEN/TC 88	Thermal insulating materials and products	01.01.1977	Active
CEN/TC 89	Thermal performance of buildings and building components	01.01.1976	Active
CEN/TC 90	Climatic zones in Europe	01.01.1976	Disbanded
CEN/TC 91	Particleboards - Formaldehyde	01.01.1977	Disbanded
CEN/TC 92	Water meters	01.01.1994	Active
CEN/TC 93	Ladders	01.01.1978	Active
CEN/TC 94	Ready-mixed concrete - Production and delivery	01.01.1978	Disbanded
CEN/TC 95	Technical safety requirements for the design and construction of injection moulding machines for plastics and rubber	01.01.1979	Disbanded
CEN/TC 96	Drainage equipment outside buildings	01.01.1979	Disbanded
CEN/TC 97	General purpose and special nails	01.01.1979	Disbanded
CEN/TC 98	Lifting platforms	01.01.1979	Active
CEN/TC 99	Wallcoverings	01.01.1979	Active
CEN/TC 100	Tactile danger warnings on packaging	01.01.1980	Disbanded
CEN/TC 101	Steel drums	01.01.1980	Disbanded
CEN/TC 102	Sterilizers for medical purposes	01.01.1982	Active
CEN/TC 103	Adhesives for wood and derived timber products	01.01.1980	Disbanded
CEN/TC 104	Concrete and related products	01.01.1981	Active
CEN/TC 105	Valves and fittings to equip radiators	01.01.1981	Disbanded
CEN/TC 106	Large kitchen appliances using gaseous fuels	01.01.1981	Active
CEN/TC 107	Prefabricated district heating and district cooling pipe system	01.01.1982	Active
CEN/TC 108	Sealing materials and lubricants for gas appliances and gas equipment	01.01.1982	Disbanded
CEN/TC 109	Central heating boilers using gaseous fuels	01.01.1985	Active
CEN/TC 110	Heat exchangers	01.01.1983	Active
CEN/TC 111	Propellants for commercial ammunition	01.01.1984	Disbanded
CEN/TC 112	Wood-based panels	01.01.1984	Active
CEN/TC 113	Heat pumps and air conditioning units	01.01.1984	Active
CEN/TC 114	Safety of machinery	01.01.1985	Active
CEN/TC 115	European first-aid box	01.01.1985	Disbanded
CEN/TC 116	Bitumen sheeting	01.01.1985	Disbanded
CEN/TC 117	Thermoplastic and elastomeric roofing and sealing sheeting	01.01.1985	Disbanded
CEN/TC 118	Technical safety requirements for the design and construction of machines for the compression moulding of plastics and rubber	01.01.1985	Disbanded
CEN/TC 119	Swap bodies for combined goods transport	01.01.1986	Active
CEN/TC 120	Sacks for the transport of food aid	01.01.1987	Disbanded
CEN/TC 121	Welding and allied processes	01.01.1987	Active
CEN/TC 122	Ergonomics	01.01.1987	Active
CEN/TC 123	Lasers and photonics	01.01.1987	Active
CEN/TC 124	Timber structures	01.01.1987	Active
CEN/TC 125	Masonry	01.01.1987	Active
CEN/TC 126	Acoustic properties of building elements and of buildings	01.01.1987	Active
CEN/TC 127	Fire safety in buildings	01.01.1987	Active
CEN/TC 128	Roof covering products for discontinuous laying and products for wall cladding	01.01.1987	Active
CEN/TC 129	Glass in building	01.01.1987	Active
CEN/TC 130	Space heating appliances without integral heat sources	01.01.1987	Active
CEN/TC 131	Gas burners using fans	01.01.1987	Active
CEN/TC 132	Aluminium and aluminium alloys	01.01.1987	Active
CEN/TC 133	Copper and copper alloys	01.01.1987	Active
CEN/TC 134	Resilient, textile and laminate floor coverings	01.01.1987	Active
CEN/TC 135	Execution of steel structures and aluminium structures	01.01.1988	Active
CEN/TC 136	Sports, playground and other recreational facilities and equipment	01.01.1988	Active
CEN/TC 137	Assessment of workplace exposure to chemical and biological agents	01.01.1988	Active
CEN/TC 138	Non-destructive testing	01.01.1988	Active
CEN/TC 139	Paints and varnishes	01.01.1988	Active
CEN/TC 140	In vitro diagnostic medical devices	01.01.1988	Active
CEN/TC 141	Pressure gauges - Thermometers - Means of measuring and/or recording temperature in the cold chain	01.01.1988	Disbanded
CEN/TC 142	Woodworking machines - Safety	01.01.1988	Active
CEN/TC 143	Machine tools - Safety	01.01.1988	Active
CEN/TC 144	Tractors and machinery for agriculture and forestry	01.01.1988	Active
CEN/TC 145	Plastics and rubber machines	01.01.1988	Active
CEN/TC 146	Packaging machines - Safety	01.01.1988	Active
CEN/TC 147	Cranes - Safety	01.01.1988	Active
CEN/TC 148	Continuous handling equipment and systems - Safety	01.01.1988	Active
CEN/TC 149	Power-operated warehouse equipment	01.01.1988	Active
CEN/TC 150	Industrial Trucks - Safety	01.01.1988	Active
CEN/TC 151	Construction equipment and building material machines - Safety	01.01.1988	Active
CEN/TC 152	Fairground and amusement park machinery and structures - Safety	01.01.1988	Active
CEN/TC 153	Machinery intended for use with foodstuffs and feed	01.01.1988	Active
CEN/TC 154	Aggregates	01.01.1988	Active
CEN/TC 155	Plastics piping systems and ducting systems	01.01.1988	Active
CEN/TC 156	Ventilation for buildings	01.01.1988	Active
CEN/TC 157	Non-refillable metallic gas cartridges	01.01.1988	Disbanded
CEN/TC 158	Head protection	01.01.1988	Active
CEN/TC 159	Hearing protectors	01.01.1988	Active
CEN/TC 160	Protection against falls from height including working belts	01.01.1988	Active
CEN/TC 161	Foot and leg protectors	01.01.1988	Active
CEN/TC 162	Protective clothing including hand and arm protection and lifejackets	01.01.1988	Active
CEN/TC 163	Sanitary appliances	01.01.1988	Active
CEN/TC 164	Water supply	01.01.1988	Active
CEN/TC 165	Waste water engineering	01.01.1988	Active
CEN/TC 166	Chimneys	01.01.1988	Active
CEN/TC 167	Structural bearings	01.01.1988	Active
CEN/TC 168	Chains, ropes, webbing, slings and accessories - Safety	01.01.1988	Active
CEN/TC 169	Light and lighting	01.01.1988	Active
CEN/TC 170	Ophthalmic optics	01.01.1988	Active
CEN/TC 171	Heat cost allocation	01.01.1989	Active
CEN/TC 172	Pulp, paper and board	01.01.1988	Active
CEN/TC 173	Brushware	01.01.1988	Disbanded
CEN/TC 174	Fruit and vegetable juices - Methods of analysis	01.01.1988	Disbanded
CEN/TC 175	Round and sawn timber	01.01.1989	Active
CEN/TC 176	Thermal energy meters	01.01.1989	Active
CEN/TC 177	Prefabricated reinforced components of autoclaved aerated concrete or light-weight aggregate concrete with open structure	01.01.1989	Active
CEN/TC 178	Paving units and kerbs	01.01.1989	Active
CEN/TC 179	Gas-fired air heaters	01.01.1989	Disbanded
CEN/TC 180	Decentralized gas heating	01.01.1989	Active
CEN/TC 181	Dedicated liquefied petroleum gas appliances	01.01.1989	Active
CEN/TC 182	Refrigerating systems, safety and environmental requirements	01.01.1989	Active
CEN/TC 183	Waste management	01.01.1989	Active
CEN/TC 184	Advanced technical ceramics	01.01.1989	Active
CEN/TC 185	Fasteners	01.01.1989	Active
CEN/TC 186	Industrial thermoprocessing - Safety	01.01.1989	Active
CEN/TC 187	Refractory products and materials	01.01.1989	Active
CEN/TC 188	Conveyor belts	01.01.1989	Active
CEN/TC 189	Geosynthetics	01.01.1989	Active
CEN/TC 190	Foundry technology	01.01.1989	Active
CEN/TC 191	Fixed firefighting systems	01.01.1989	Active
CEN/TC 192	Fire and Rescue Service Equipment	01.01.1989	Active
CEN/TC 193	Adhesives	01.01.1989	Active
CEN/TC 194	Utensils in contact with food	01.01.1989	Active
CEN/TC 195	Air filters for general air cleaning	01.01.1989	Active
CEN/TC 196	Machines for underground mines - Safety	01.01.1989	Active
CEN/TC 197	Pumps	01.01.1989	Active
CEN/TC 198	Printing and paper machinery - Safety	01.01.1989	Active
CEN/TC 199	Fans - Safety	01.01.1989	Disbanded
CEN/TC 200	Tannery machinery - Safety	01.01.1989	Disbanded
CEN/TC 201	Leather and imitation leather goods and footwear manufacturing machinery - Safety	01.01.1989	Disbanded
CEN/TC 202	Foundry machinery	01.01.1989	Active
CEN/TC 203	Cast iron pipes, fittings and their joints	01.01.1989	Active
CEN/TC 204	Sterilization of medical devices	01.01.1989	Active
CEN/TC 205	Non-active medical devices	01.01.1989	Active
CEN/TC 206	Biological evaluation of medical devices	01.01.1989	Active
CEN/TC 207	Furniture	01.01.1989	Active
CEN/TC 208	Elastomeric seals for joints in pipework and pipelines	01.01.1989	Active
CEN/TC 209	Zinc and zinc alloys	01.01.1989	Active
CEN/TC 210	GRP tanks and vessels	01.01.1989	Active
CEN/TC 211	Acoustics	01.01.1989	Active
CEN/TC 212	Pyrotechnic articles	01.01.1989	Active
CEN/TC 213	Cartridge operated hand-held tools - Safety	01.01.1989	Active
CEN/TC 214	Textile machinery and accessories	01.01.1989	Active
CEN/TC 215	Respiratory and anaesthetic equipment	01.01.1989	Active
CEN/TC 216	Chemical disinfectants and antiseptics	01.01.1989	Active
CEN/TC 217	Surfaces for sports areas	01.01.1989	Active
CEN/TC 218	Rubber and plastics hoses and hose assemblies	01.01.1989	Active
CEN/TC 219	Cathodic protection	01.01.1990	Active
CEN/TC 220	Tin and tin alloys	01.01.1989	Disbanded
CEN/TC 221	Shop fabricated metallic tanks and equipment for storage tanks and for service stations	01.01.1989	Disbanded
CEN/TC 222	Feather and down as filling material for any article, as well as finished articles filled with feather and down	01.01.1989	Disbanded
CEN/TC 223	Soil improvers and growing media	01.01.1989	Active
CEN/TC 224	Personal identification and related personal devices with secure element, systems, operations and privacy in a multi sectorial environment	01.01.1989	Active
CEN/TC 225	AIDC technologies	01.01.1989	Active
CEN/TC 226	Road equipment	01.01.1989	Active
CEN/TC 227	Road materials	01.01.1989	Active
CEN/TC 228	Heating systems and water based cooling systems in buildings	01.01.1989	Active
CEN/TC 229	Precast concrete products	01.01.1989	Active
CEN/TC 230	Water analysis	01.01.1989	Active
CEN/TC 231	Mechanical vibration and shock	01.01.1990	Active
CEN/TC 232	Compressors, vacuum pumps and their systems	01.01.1990	Active
CEN/TC 233	Biotechnology	01.01.1990	Dormant
CEN/TC 234	Gas infrastructure	01.01.1990	Active
CEN/TC 235	Gas pressure regulators and associated safety devices for use in gas transmission and distribution	01.01.1990	Active
CEN/TC 236	Non industrial manually operated shut-off valves for gas and particular combinations valves-other products	01.01.1990	Active
CEN/TC 237	Gas meters	01.01.1990	Active
CEN/TC 238	Test gases, test pressures and categories of appliances	01.01.1990	Active
CEN/TC 239	Rescue systems	01.01.1990	Active
CEN/TC 240	Thermal spraying and thermally sprayed coatings	01.01.1990	Active
CEN/TC 241	Gypsum and gypsum based products	01.01.1990	Active
CEN/TC 242	Safety requirements for passenger transportation by rope	01.01.1990	Active
CEN/TC 243	Cleanroom technology	01.01.1990	Active
CEN/TC 244	Measurement of fluid flow in closed conduits	01.01.1990	Dormant
CEN/TC 245	Leisure accommodation vehicles	01.01.1990	Active
CEN/TC 246	Natural stones	01.01.1990	Active
CEN/TC 247	Building Automation, Controls and Building Management	01.01.1990	Active
CEN/TC 248	Textiles and textile products	01.01.1990	Active
CEN/TC 249	Plastics	01.01.1990	Active
CEN/TC 250	Structural Eurocodes	01.01.1990	Active
CEN/TC 251	Health informatics	01.01.1990	Active
CEN/TC 252	Child use and care articles	01.01.1990	Active
CEN/TC 253	Self-adhesive tapes	01.01.1990	Disbanded
CEN/TC 254	Flexible sheets for waterproofing	01.01.1990	Active
CEN/TC 255	Hand-held, non-electric power tools - Safety	01.01.1990	Active
CEN/TC 256	Railway applications	01.01.1990	Active
CEN/TC 257	Symbols and information provided with medical devices and nomenclature for regulatory data exchange	01.01.1990	Disbanded
CEN/TC 258	Clinical investigation of medical devices	01.01.1990	Active
CEN/TC 259	Medical alarms and signals	01.01.1990	Disbanded
CEN/TC 260	Fertilizers and liming materials	01.01.1990	Active
CEN/TC 261	Packaging	01.01.1990	Active
CEN/TC 262	Metallic and other inorganic coatings	01.01.1990	Active
CEN/TC 263	Secure storage of cash, valuables and data media	01.01.1990	Active
CEN/TC 264	Air quality	01.01.1990	Active
CEN/TC 265	Metallic tanks for the storage of liquids	01.01.1990	Active
CEN/TC 266	Thermoplastic static tanks	01.01.1990	Active
CEN/TC 267	Industrial piping and pipelines	01.01.1990	Active
CEN/TC 268	Cryogenic vessels and specific hydrogen technologies applications	01.01.1990	Active
CEN/TC 269	Shell and water-tube boilers	01.01.1990	Active
CEN/TC 270	Internal combustion engines	01.01.1990	Active
CEN/TC 271	Surface treatment equipment - Safety	01.01.1990	Active
CEN/TC 272	Metrology of porous filtration membranes	01.01.1990	Dormant
CEN/TC 273	Logistics	01.01.1990	Disbanded
CEN/TC 274	Aircraft ground support equipment	01.01.1990	Active
CEN/TC 275	Food analysis - Horizontal methods	01.01.1990	Active
CEN/TC 276	Surface active agents	01.01.1990	Active
CEN/TC 277	Suspended ceilings	01.01.1991	Active
CEN/TC 278	Intelligent transport systems	01.01.1991	Active
CEN/TC 279	Value management - Value analysis, function analysis	01.01.1991	Active
CEN/TC 280	Offshore containers	01.01.1991	Disbanded
CEN/TC 281	Appliances, solid fuels and firelighters for barbecuing	01.01.1991	Active
CEN/TC 282	Installation and equipment for LNG	01.01.1991	Active
CEN/TC 283	Precious metals - Applications in jewellery and associated products	01.01.1991	Disbanded
CEN/TC 284	Greenhouses	01.01.1991	Active
CEN/TC 285	Non-active surgical implants	01.01.1991	Active
CEN/TC 286	Liquefied petroleum gas equipment and accessories	01.01.1991	Active
CEN/TC 287	Geographic Information	01.01.1991	Active
CEN/TC 288	Execution of special geotechnical works	01.01.1991	Active
CEN/TC 289	Leather	01.01.1991	Active
CEN/TC 290	Dimensional and geometrical product specification and verification	01.01.1991	Active
CEN/TC 291	Self-service shopping trolleys	01.01.1991	Disbanded
CEN/TC 292	Characterization of waste	01.01.1991	Active
CEN/TC 293	Assistive products for persons with disability	01.01.1991	Active
CEN/TC 294	Communication systems for meters and remote reading of meters	01.01.1991	Active
CEN/TC 295	Residential solid fuel burning appliances	01.01.1991	Active
CEN/TC 296	Tanks for the transport of dangerous goods	01.01.1991	Active
CEN/TC 297	Free-standing industrial chimneys	01.01.1992	Active
CEN/TC 298	Pigments and extenders	01.01.1992	Active
CEN/TC 299	Gas-fired sorption appliances, indirect fired sorption appliances, gas-fired endothermic engine heat pumps and domestic gas-fired washing and drying appliances.	01.01.1992	Active
CEN/TC 300	Sea-going vessels and marine technology	01.01.1992	Disbanded
CEN/TC 301	Road vehicles	01.01.1992	Active
CEN/TC 302	Milk and milk products - Methods of sampling and analysis	01.01.1992	Active
CEN/TC 303	Floor screeds and screed materials	01.01.1992	Active
CEN/TC 304	Information and communications technologies - European localization requirements	01.01.1992	Dormant
CEN/TC 305	Potentially explosive atmospheres - Explosion prevention and protection	01.01.1992	Active
CEN/TC 306	Lead and lead alloys	01.01.1992	Dormant
CEN/TC 307	Oilseeds, vegetable and animal fats and oils and their by-products - Methods of sampling and analysis	01.01.1992	Active
CEN/TC 308	Characterization and management of sludge	01.01.1993	Active
CEN/TC 309	Footwear	01.01.1993	Active
CEN/TC 310	Advanced automation technologies and their applications	01.01.1993	Active
CEN/TC 311	Information Systems Engineering (ISE)	01.01.1993	Disbanded
CEN/TC 312	Thermal solar systems and components	01.01.1993	Active
CEN/TC 313	Centrifuges	01.01.1993	Active
CEN/TC 314	Mastic asphalt for waterproofing	01.01.1993	Dormant
CEN/TC 315	Spectator facilities	01.01.1993	Active
CEN/TC 316	Medical products utilizing cells, tissues and/or their derivatives	01.01.1993	Active
CEN/TC 317	Derivatives from coal pyrolysis	01.01.1993	Active
CEN/TC 318	Hydrometry	01.01.1993	Active
CEN/TC 319	Maintenance	01.01.1993	Active
CEN/TC 320	Transport - Logistics and services	01.01.1993	Active
CEN/TC 321	Explosives for civil uses	01.01.1994	Active
CEN/TC 322	Equipments for making and shaping of metals - Safety requirements	01.01.1994	Active
CEN/TC 323	Raised access floors	01.01.1994	Dormant
CEN/TC 324	Castors and wheels	01.01.1994	Disbanded
CEN/TC 325	Crime prevention through building, facility and area design	01.01.1995	Active
CEN/TC 326	Gas supply for Natural Gas Vehicles (NGV)	01.01.1995	Active
CEN/TC 327	Animal feeding stuffs - Methods of sampling and analysis	01.01.1995	Active
CEN/TC 328	Standard measuring system for cleaning performance	01.01.1995	Disbanded
CEN/TC 329	Tourism services	01.01.1995	Active
CEN/TC 330	Qualification of construction enterprises	01.01.1995	Dormant
CEN/TC 331	Postal services	01.01.1996	Active
CEN/TC 332	Laboratory equipment	01.01.1997	Active
CEN/TC 333	Cycles	01.01.1998	Active
CEN/TC 334	Irrigation techniques	01.01.1998	Active
CEN/TC 335	Solid biofuels	05.04.2000	Active
CEN/TC 336	Bituminous binders	30.08.2000	Active
CEN/TC 337	Road operation equipment and products	09.11.2000	Active
CEN/TC 338	Cereal and cereal products	02.05.2001	Active
CEN/TC 339	Slip resistance of pedestrian surfaces - Methods of evaluation	25.07.2001	Active
CEN/TC 340	Anti-seismic devices	03.09.2001	Active
CEN/TC 341	Geotechnical Investigation and Testing	12.09.2001	Active
CEN/TC 342	Metal hoses, hose assemblies, bellows and expansion joints	11.02.2002	Active
CEN/TC 343	Solid Recovered Fuels	25.03.2002	Active
CEN/TC 344	Steel static storage systems	23.09.2002	Active
CEN/TC 345	Characterization of soils	09.12.2002	Active
CEN/TC 346	Conservation of Cultural Heritage	20.02.2003	Active
CEN/TC 347	Methods for analysis of allergens	01.07.2003	Active
CEN/TC 348	Facility Management	21.11.2003	Active
CEN/TC 349	Sealants for joints in building construction	12.05.2004	Active
CEN/TC 350	Sustainability of construction works	28.07.2005	Active
CEN/TC 351	Construction Products - Assessment of release of dangerous substances	05.01.2006	Active
CEN/TC 352	Nanotechnologies	09.12.2005	Active
CEN/TC 353	Information and Communication Technologies for Learning, Education and Training	19.03.2007	Active
CEN/TC 354	Non-type approved light motorized vehicles for the transportation of persons and goods and related facilities	16.10.2007	Active
CEN/TC 355	Lighters	29.11.2007	Active
CEN/TC 356	Industrial fans - safety requirements	29.11.2007	Active
CEN/TC 357	Stretched ceilings	29.11.2007	Active
CEN/TC 358	Project Committee - Small-bore connectors for liquids and gases in healthcare applications	04.12.2007	Disbanded
CEN/TC 359	Project Committee - Hyperbaric chambers	04.12.2007	Disbanded
CEN/TC 360	Coating systems for chemical apparatus and plants against corrosion	21.12.2007	Active
CEN/TC 361	Polymer modified bituminous thick coatings for waterproofing - Definitions/requirements and test methods	21.12.2007	Active
CEN/TC 362	Healthcare services - Quality management systems	21.12.2007	Active
CEN/TC 363	Organic contaminants (tar) in biomass producer gases	21.12.2007	Active
CEN/TC 364	High Chairs	21.12.2007	Active
CEN/TC 365	Internet Filtering	21.12.2007	Active
CEN/TC 366	Materials obtained from End-of-Life Tyres (ELT)	18.01.2008	Active
CEN/TC 367	Breath-alcohol testers	18.01.2008	Active
CEN/TC 368	Product Identification	18.01.2008	Active
CEN/TC 369	Candle fire safety	18.01.2008	Active
CEN/TC 370	Project Committee - Security services	18.01.2008	Disbanded
CEN/TC 371	Energy Performance of Building project group	18.01.2008	Active
CEN/TC 372	Project Committee - Cinematographic Works	18.01.2008	Disbanded
CEN/TC 373	Project Committee - Services of Real Estate Agents	18.01.2008	Disbanded
CEN/TC 374	Project Committee - Business Support Services	18.01.2008	Disbanded
CEN/TC 375	Project Committee - Customer Contact Services	18.01.2008	Disbanded
CEN/TC 376	Project Committee - Print Media Analyses Services	18.01.2008	Disbanded
CEN/TC 377	Air Traffic Management	18.01.2008	Active
CEN/TC 378	Project Committee - Springs	18.01.2008	Disbanded
CEN/TC 379	Project Committee - Supply Chain security	18.01.2008	Disbanded
CEN/TC 380	Project Committee - Hearing aid specialist services	18.01.2008	Disbanded
CEN/TC 381	Management consultancy services	06.03.2008	Active
CEN/TC 382	PFOS	13.03.2008	Active
CEN/TC 383	Sustainably produced biomass for energy applications	21.05.2008	Active
CEN/TC 384	Project Committee - Airport and aviation security services	01.07.2008	Disbanded
CEN/TC 385	Project Committee - Services for sheltered housing for the elderly	13.06.2008	Disbanded
CEN/TC 386	Photocatalysis	01.07.2008	Active
CEN/TC 387	Project Committee - Food data	31.07.2008	Disbanded
CEN/TC 388	Perimeter Protection	16.09.2008	Active
CEN/TC 389	Innovation Management	02.12.2008	Active
CEN/TC 390	Project Committee - Criteria for design, performance, test methods and maintenance of roof gardens	28.01.2009	Disbanded
CEN/TC 391	Societal and Citizen Security	28.01.2009	Active
CEN/TC 392	Cosmetics	21.01.2009	Active
CEN/TC 393	Equipment for storage tanks and for filling stations	16.01.2009	Active
CEN/TC 394	Project Committee - Services of chiropractors	21.01.2009	Disbanded
CEN/TC 395	Engineering consultancy services	20.02.2009	Disbanded
CEN/TC 396	Earthworks	31.03.2009	Active
CEN/TC 397	Baling presses - Safety requirements	06.04.2009	Active
CEN/TC 398	Child Protective Products	22.04.2009	Active
CEN/TC 399	Gas Turbines applications - Safety	06.07.2009	Active
CEN/TC 400	Horizontal standards in the fields of sludge, biowaste and soil	24.11.2009	Active
CEN/TC 401	Reduced Ignition Propensity Cigarettes	23.03.2010	Active
CEN/TC 402	Domestic Pools and Spas	26.03.2010	Active
CEN/TC 403	Aesthetic surgery and aesthetic non-surgical medical services	27.04.2010	Active
CEN/TC 404	Services of pest management companies	10.08.2010	Active
CEN/TC 405	Expertise services	07.12.2010	Active
CEN/TC 406	Mechanical products - Ecodesign methodology	07.12.2010	Active
CEN/TC 407	Cylindrical helical springs made from round wire and bar - Calculation and design	10.02.2011	Active
CEN/TC 408	Natural gas and biomethane for use in transport and biomethane for injection in the natural gas grid	24.03.2011	Active
CEN/TC 409	Beauty Salon Services	31.03.2011	Active
CEN/TC 410	Consumer confidence and nomenclature in the diamond industry	31.03.2011	Active
CEN/TC 411	Bio-based products	25.05.2011	Active
CEN/TC 412	Indoor sun exposure services	27.07.2011	Active
CEN/TC 413	Insulated means of transport for temperature sensitive goods with or without cooling and/or heating device	08.08.2011	Active
CEN/TC 414	Services in Osteopathy	02.11.2011	Active
CEN/TC 415	Sustainable and Traceable Cocoa	29.11.2011	Active
CEN/TC 416	Health risk assessment of chemicals	06.12.2011	Active
CEN/TC 417	Maritime and port security services	06.12.2011	Active
CEN/TC 418	Project Committee - Exchange format in marine and transport insurance	13.02.2012	Disbanded
CEN/TC 419	Forensic Science Processes	30.05.2012	Active
CEN/TC 420	Service Excellence Systems	13.06.2012	Active
CEN/TC 421	Emission safety of combustible air fresheners	02.10.2012	Active
CEN/TC 422	Side curtains ventilation systems - safety	07.11.2012	Active
CEN/TC 423	Means of measuring and/or recording temperature in the cold chain	06.02.2013	Active
CEN/TC 424	Care services for cleft lip and/or palate	19.04.2013	Active
CEN/TC 425	Halal Food	19.04.2013	Active
CEN/TC 426	Domestic appliances used for water treatment not connected to water supply	20.06.2013	Active
CEN/TC 427	Services of Medical Doctors with additional qualification in Homeopathy	07.08.2013	Active
CEN/TC 428	e-competences and ICT Professionalism	28.08.2013	Active
CEN/TC 429	Food hygiene - Commercial warewashing machines - Hygiene requirements and testing	25.09.2013	Active
CEN/TC 430	Nuclear energy, nuclear technologies, and radiological protection	25.09.2013	Active
CEN/TC 431	Service Chain for Social Care Alarms	16.10.2013	Active
CEN/TC 432	Competency for Customs Representatives	30.10.2013	Active
CEN/TC 433	Entertainment Technology - Machinery, equipment and installations	11.03.2014	Active
CEN/TC 434	Electronic Invoicing	07.05.2014	Active
CEN/TC 435	Tattooing services	07.07.2014	Active
CEN/TC 436	Cabin Air Quality on commercial aircraft - Chemical Agents	16.12.2014	Active
CEN/TC 437	Electronic cigarettes and e-liquids	21.01.2015	Active
CEN/TC 438	Additive Manufacturing	28.01.2015	Active
CEN/TC 439	Private security services	18.02.2015	Active
CEN/TC 440	Electronic Public Procurement	04.03.2015	Active
CEN/TC 441	Fuel labelling	04.03.2015	Active
CEN/TC 442	Building Information Modelling (BIM)	08.04.2015	Active
CEN/TC 443	Feather and down	16.04.2015	Active
