= CEN/TC 434 =

Technical committee for electronic invoicing standards

CEN/TC 434 (CEN Technical Committee 434) is a technical body within the European Committee for Standardization (CEN) established in 2014 to develop standards in the field of electronic invoicing.

== Overview ==
CEN/TC 434 has developed the European Standard on Electronic Invoicing (EN 16931-1) and other ancillary standardization deliverables required by the European Union's directive on electronic invoicing in public procurement, Directive 2014/55/EU.

Directive 2014/55/EU also required:

- the test of the standard as to its practical application for an end user,
- a report on the outcome of the test to the European Parliament and the Council by the European Commission and, after the publication and the test of the standard,
- the publication in the Official Journal of the European Union of a reference to the European Standard together with the list of a limited number of syntaxes (that CEN published as TS 16931-2).

The European E-Invoice Service Providers Association (EESPA) has played an active role in CEN/TC 434.

== Workgroups ==
CEN/TC 434 has the following working groups (WGs):

- CEN/TC 434/WG 1 Core semantic data model
- CEN/TC 434/WG 3 Syntax bindings
- CEN/TC 434/WG 4 Guidelines at transmission level
- CEN/TC 434/WG 5 Extension methodology
- CEN/TC 434/WG 6 Test methodology and test results
- CEN/TC 434/WG 7 Registry Services

CEN/TC 434/WG 2 (List of syntaxes) was disbanded.

== Published standards ==
- EN 16931-1:2017 Electronic invoicing - Part 1: Semantic data model of the core elements of an electronic invoice (published on 2017-06-28)
- CEN/TS 16931-2:2017 Electronic invoicing - Part 2: List of syntaxes that comply with EN 16931-1 (published on 2017-06-28)
- CEN/TS 16931-3-1:2017 Electronic invoicing - Part 3-1: Methodology for syntax bindings of the core elements of an electronic invoice (published on 2017-07-05)
- CEN/TS 16931-3-2:2017/AC:2018 Electronic invoicing - Part 3-2: Syntax binding for ISO/IEC 19845 (UBL 2.1) invoice and credit note (published on 2018-07-18)
- CEN/TS 16931-3-3:2017 Electronic invoicing - Part 3-3: Syntax binding for UN/CEFACT XML Industry Invoice D16B (published on 2017-10-18)
- CEN/TS 16931-3-4:2017 Electronic invoicing - Part 3-4: Syntax binding for UN/EDIFACT INVOIC D16B (published on 2017-10-18)
- CEN/TR 16931-4:2017 Electronic invoicing - Part 4: Guidelines on interoperability of electronic invoices at the transmission level (published on 2017-07-05)
- CEN/TR 16931-5:2017 Electronic invoicing - Part 5: Guidelines on the use of sector or country extensions in conjunction with EN 16931–1, methodology to be applied in the real environment (published on 2017-07-05)
- CEN/TR 16931-6:2017 Electronic invoicing - Part 6: Result of the test of EN 16931–1 with respect to its practical application for an end user (published on 2017-10-18)

Thanks to an agreement between CEN and the European Commission, EN 16931-1:2017 and CEN/TS 16931-2:2017 are available free of charge from the CEN members (i.e. the European national standardization bodies).

== Validation artefacts ==
Schematron validation artefacts for Universal Business Language (UBL), cross-industry invoicing (CII) and XML EDIFACT invoices, compliant with EN 16931-1, are available here.

== See also ==
- List of CEN technical committees
- CEN/TC 434 page on CEN site
- CEN/TC 434 published standards
- CEF Digital
- CEF Digital — eInvoicing
