= B2B Gateway =

Platform for business-to-business communications

Business-to-Business (B2B) Gateways integrate data from back-end systems, enabling information exchange across trading partners. B2B Gateways also provide a centralized point for transformation of multiple data sources through interoperability standards such as XML (Extensible Markup Language), cXML(Commerce XML) and EDI (Electronic data interchange). B2B Gateways provide businesses an e-commerce platform for integrating with key suppliers and customers quickly and easily. The platform is often a component of a company's Service-Oriented Architecture (SOA) architecture. Other capabilities of the B2B Gateway include trading partner management and security control. B2B Gateways help to bridge the collaboration gap across the supply chain partners and transform the data flow between companies from a batch oriented manner into a real time process. This streamlines the processing and enables for business activity monitoring(BAM) systems to be implemented, which provides the enterprise with greater visibility and proactive control over the applications. B2B Gateways continue to be in high demand for organizations of every size.

== See also ==
- B2B e-Marketplace
- Business Interoperability Interface
- Business-to-consumer
- Business-to-employee
- Center for E-Commerce Infrastructure Development
- Consumer-to-consumer
- E-business
- E-Business XML (ebXML)
- Electronic Commerce
- Online shopping
- Private Electronic Market
- UN/CEFACT's Modeling Methodology (UMM)
