= Hiroki Ueda =

Japanese professor of biology

Doctor of Philosophy Hiroki Ueda
- Born: 1975 (age 50–51); Fukuoka, Japan
- Education: University of Tokyo
- Scientific career
- Fields: Biology
- Workplaces: University of Tokyo; RIKEN Quantitative Biology Center; Kyoto University; Osaka University; Tohoku University

Hiroki R. Ueda (上田 泰己, Ueda Hiroki) is a Japanese professor of biology at the University of Tokyo and the RIKEN Quantitative Biology Center. He is known for his studies on the circadian clock.

== Career ==
Hiroki R. Ueda was born in Fukuoka, Japan, in 1975. He graduated from the Faculty of Medicine, the University of Tokyo in 2000, and obtained his Ph.D. in 2004 from the same university. He was appointed as a team leader in RIKEN Center for Developmental Biology (CDB) from 2003 and promoted to be a project leader at RIKEN CDB in 2009, and to be a group director at RIKEN Quantitative Biology Center (QBiC) in 2011. He became a professor of Graduate School of Medicine, the University of Tokyo in 2013. He is currently appointed as a team leader in RIKEN Center for Biosystems Dynamics Research (BDR), an affiliate professor in Graduate School of Information Science and Technology and a principal investigator in IRCN (International Research Center for Neurointelligence) in the University of Tokyo, an invited professor in Osaka University, and a visiting professor in Tokushima universities.

== Awards ==
He received awards, including Tokyo Techno Forum 21, Gold Medal (Tokyo Techno Forum 21, 2005), Young Investigator Awards (MEXT, 2006) and IBM Science Award (IBM, 2009), a Young Investigator Promotion Awards (Japanese Society for Chronobiology, 2007). He also received Tsukahara Award (Brain Science Foundation, 2012), Japan Innovator Awards (Nikkei Business Publications Inc. 2004), Teiichi Yamazaki Award (Foundation for Promotion of Material Science and Technology of Japan, 2015), Innovator of the Year (2017) and The Ichimura Prize in Science for Excellent Achievement (Ichimura Foundation for New Technology, 2018).
