= XDF =

XDF may refer to:

- Extensible Data Format, in science
- Hubble eXtreme Deep Field, an astrophotograph
- IBM Extended Density Format, for floppy disks
