= OCI =

OCI may refer to:

== Businesses and organizations ==
- OCI (company), green energy and chemical company, South Korea
- Oakwood Collegiate Institute, Toronto, Canada
- Office of Criminal Investigations of the U.S. Food and Drug Administration
- Olympic Council of Ireland, former name the national olympic committee of Ireland
- Ontario Cancer Institute, Canada
- Order of the Crown of Italy, Italian order
- Open Constitution Initiative, advocacy group in China
- OCI NV, parent company of Orascom Construction
- Ottawa Collegiate Institute, now Lisgar Collegiate Institute, Canada
- Organisation Communiste Internationaliste, (Internationalist Communist Organisation), former French political party

== Computing ==
- Open Catalog Interface, an interface standard in computing
- Open Container Initiative, a Linux standards project in computing
- Oracle Call Interface, database interface software

== Other uses ==
- oci, ISO 639-2/3 language code for Occitan language
- Organizational conflict of interest
- Other comprehensive income
- Overseas Citizen of India, a scheme granting a status similar to, but not the same as, dual citizenship in India
