= BFD =

BFD may refer to:

== Agencies ==
- Bakersfield Fire Department, Bakersfield, California
- Boston Fire Department, Boston, Massachusetts
- Brooklyn Fire Department (former), Brooklyn, New York
- Buffalo Fire Department, Buffalo, New York

== Computing ==
- Bidirectional Forwarding Detection, a network protocol used to detect faults between devices
- Binary File Descriptor library, the GNU Project's main mechanism for the portable manipulation of object files in a variety of formats
- Binary Format Description language, an extension of XSIL
- A virtual music instrument meant to simulate a drumset, released by FXpansion

== Media ==
- Benelux Film Distributors, a joint venture of various independent film distributors
- BFD, an annual alternative music festival hosted by the radio station Live 105

== Transportation ==
- Bakersfield (Amtrak station), California (Amtrak station code)
- Beaconsfield railway station, Melbourne
- Bradford Regional Airport, Bradford, Pennsylvania (IATA airport code)
- Brentford railway station, London, England (National Rail station code)

== Other ==
- Back focal distance or back focal length, in optics
- Bafut language (ISO 639 alpha-3 code: bfd)
- BFD Energy Challenger, a professional tennis tournament in Rome, Italy
- Boiler feedwater pump, a type of pump used to pump feedwater into a steam boiler
- Bounded factorization domain, a particular kind of atomic domain
- Budgerigar fledgling disease, a virus, frequently fatal to caged birds
- Bund Freier Demokraten, the German acronym for Association of Free Democrats
- Bundesfreiwilligendienst or Federal volunteers service, Germany
- Conker's Bad Fur Day, a 2001 video game
