= Business process network =

Aspect of business management

Business process networks (BPN), also referred to as business service networks or business process hubs, enable the efficient execution of multi-enterprise operational processes, including supply chain planning and execution. A BPN extends and implements an organization's Service-orientation in Enterprise Applications.

To execute such processes, BPNs combine integration services with application services, often to support a particular industry or process, such as order management, logistics management, or automated shipping and receiving.

== Purpose ==
Most organizations derive their primary value (e.g., revenue) and attain their goals outside of the 'four walls' of the enterprise-—by selling to consumers (B2C) or to other businesses (Business-to-business). Thus, businesses seek to efficiently manage processes that span multiple organizations. One such process is supply chain management; BPNs are gaining in popularity partly because of the changing nature of supply chains, which have become global. Trends such as global sourcing and offshoring to Asia, India and other low-cost production regions of the world continue to add complexity to effective trading partner management and supply chain visibility.

== Complications ==
The transition to global sourcing has been challenging for some companies. Few companies have the requisite strategies, infrastructure and extended process control to effectively make the transition to global sourcing. The majority of supply managers continue to use a mix of e-mail, phone and fax to collaborate with offshore suppliers—-none of which are standardized nor easily integrated to enable informed business decisions and actions. Further, distant trading partners introduce new standards, new systems, multiple time zones, new processes and different levels of technological maturity into the supply chain. BPNs help reduce this complexity by providing a common framework for information exchange, visibility and collaboration.

BPNs are also increasingly being used to enable and manage operational, business process outsourcing (BPO) functions such as human resources, finance, information technology (IT) and other "non-core" (relative to each business) business functions, whereby the BPN facilitates collaboration and document movement between an organization and its outsourcing firm.

== Implementation ==
BPNs can be implemented using a host of technology platforms, including but not limited to traditional EDI value-added networks (VANs), industry exchanges, B2B Gateways, point to point integration brokers, VPNs, and other mechanisms that enable trading partners to connect electronically, collaborate and conduct business amongst each other.

BPNs are being further accelerated by growth in Web services and service-oriented architecture (SOA) technologies that simplify the integration of people, processes and systems.

Business Process Networks are often managed using multi-tenant architectures to more rapidly enable seamless, many-to-many or one-to-many (hub-spoke model) connectivity between trading partners across the extended supply chain.

Multi-tenant frameworks also ensure that all trading partners work from a single, shared set of applications and collaboration tools which are hosted by the network provider, mitigating integration barriers and hurdles from heterogeneous back-end IT infrastructures and systems across the trading community.

VANs and industry exchanges bring the added benefit of pre-connected trading partners, often ranging in the tens of thousands, that enable faster trading community implementation and lower overall cost to manage and maintain these connections.

== See also ==
- Supply network
- Value network
