= CEN/TC 10 =

CEN/TC 10 (CEN Technical Committee 10) is a technical decision making body within the CEN system working on the establishment of safety rules for the construction and installation of lifts, escalators, and passenger conveyors in the European Union.

CEN/TC 10 was created on 01.01.1962 and Working Groups (WG) established under this Technical Committee are:

- WG1: Lifts and service lifts
- WG2: Escalators and moving walks
- WG3: Fire testing of lift landing doors
- WG4: Data logging and remote control
- WG5: Maintenance
- WG6: Fire related issues
- WG7: Accessibility to lifts for persons including persons with disability
- WG8: Stairlifts and vertical platforms for the disabled
- WG9: Inclined lifts
- WG10: Improvement of safety of existing lifts
- WG12: Lifting tables
- WG13: Vertical lifting appliance with enclosed carrier

== See also ==
- List of CEN technical committees
- List of EN standards
