= XGMML =

Graph markup language

XGMML (the eXtensible Graph Markup and Modeling Language) is an XML application based on GML which is used for graph description.

== Functions ==
XGMML is an XML 1.0-based markup language based on the Graph Modeling Language. The language uses tags to describe the edges and nodes on a graph. It is primarily used to make the graphs more easily exchangeable and readable by different graphing software. XGMML was created for WWWPal system and was intended for use containing the structural information of websites.

XGMML is often used for data mining on websites.

== Applications supporting XGMML ==
- Cytoscape, an open source bioinformatics software platform for visualizing molecular interaction networks, loads and saves networks and node/edge attributes in XGMML
- Biomax BioXM Knowledge Management Environment, a customizable knowledge management system for life sciences, supports export of semantic network graphs as XGMML files
- JNets, a network visualization and analysis tool.

== See also ==
- LOGML, a markup language derived from XGMML
