= AdsML =

Business-to-business electronic commerce standards suite

AdsML is a suite of business-to-business electronic commerce standards intended to support the exchange of advertising business messages and content delivery using XML. It is supported by Peter Meirs of Time Inc.

Typical users include newspapers, advertising agencies, broadcasters and others who buy or sell advertising.
