= International Federation of Digital Seismograph Networks =

Global broadband seismic recorders organization

The International Federation of Digital Seismograph Networks, or FDSN, is a global organization consisting of groups that install and maintain digital, broadband seismic recorders either nationally or globally. Any organizations operating more than one broadband station is eligible for membership. Members agree to coordinate station siting and provide free and open data. This cooperation helps scientists all over the world to further the advancement of earth science and particularly the study of global seismic activity. FDSN is a participant in the Global Earth Observation System of Systems, or GEOSS.

== Data specification ==
The FDSN goals related to station siting and instrumentation are to provide stations with good geographic distribution, recording data with 24 bits of resolution in continuous time series with at least a 20 sample per second sampling rate. The FDSN was also instrumental in development of a universal standard for distribution of broadband waveform data and related parametric information (QuakeML). The Standard for Exchange of Earthquake Data (SEED) format is the result of that effort.

== See also ==
- Seismology
- IRIS Consortium
