= Core Component Technical Specification =

A cornerstone of the UN/CEFACT standardisation activities is the Core Component Technical Specification (CCTS). Core Components are the syntax-neutral and technology-independent building blocks that can be used for data modeling. Major benefits of CCTS include improved reuse of existing data artifacts, improved enterprise interoperability, and consistency across vertical industry standards.

Related work includes the OASIS CAM specification and OASIS Registry Repository specification.

== See also ==
- OASIS
- OASIS Business Document Naming and Design Rules Version 1.0 (CCTS 2.01 and XML)
- OASIS Business Document Naming and Design Rules Version 1.1 (CCTS 2.01, XML and JSON)

== Tools ==
- Crane Softwrights Ltd.'s ods2obdgc and gc2obdndr are used by the OASIS UBL committee to create XML document schemas from a spreadsheet expression of business objects described using the UN/CEFACT Core Component Technical Specification 2.01 using the OASIS Business Document Naming and Design Rules
- OASIS CAM Editor - create and compare libraries of core components from business exchanges
