= CEN/TC 165 =

European technical committee on wastewater

CEN/TC 165 (CEN Technical Committee 165) is a technical decision making body within the CEN system working on standardization in the field of wastewater engineering in the European Union. Its goal is to develop functional standards, and standards for performance and installation for systems and components in the field of wastewater engineering.

CEN/TC 165 was created on 01.01.1988 and Working Groups (WG) established under this Technical Committee are:

- WG1: General requirements for pipes
- WG2: Vitrified clay pipes
- WG4: Manhole tops, gully tops, drainage channels and other ancillary components for use outside buildings
- WG5: Fibre cement pipes
- WG7: Steel pipes
- WG8: Separators
- WG9: Concrete pipes
- WG10: Installation of buried pipes for gravity drain and sewer systems
- WG11: Gratings, covers and other ancillary components for use inside buildings
- WG12: Structural design of buried pipelines
- WG13: Renovation and repair of drains and sewers
- WG21: Drainage systems inside buildings
- WG22: Drain and sewer systems outside buildings
- WG30: Terminology in the field of wastewater engineering
- WG40: Wastewater treatment plants > 50 PT
- WG41: Small type sewage treatment plants (< 50 inhabitants)
- WG44: Non-sewered sanitation
- WG50: Use of treated wastewater

== See also ==
- List of CEN technical committees
- List of EN standards
