= CEN/TC 12 =

CEN/TC 12 (CEN Technical Committee 12) is a technical decision-making body within the CEN system working on materials, equipment and offshore structures for petroleum, petrochemical and natural gas industries in the European Union. Its goal is to develop standards for materials, equipment, and offshore structures used in the drilling, production, transport by pipelines and processing of liquid and gaseous hydrocarbons.

== See also ==
- List of CEN technical committees
- List of EN standards
