= Center for E-Commerce Infrastructure Development =

R&D center in the University of Hong Kong

Founded in January 2002, the Center for E-Commerce Infrastructure Development (CECID) is a research and development center in the University of Hong Kong committed to promoting e-commerce infrastructure development and standardization. A member of OASIS, W3C, RosettaNet, and the ebXML Asia Committee, CECID actively takes part in the development and implementation of international standards, such as Universal Business Language, Web Services, and RosettaNet. Through participation in these international and regional standards bodies, CECID follows closely the latest developments in e-commerce technology standards and promotes Hong Kong's e-commerce technology to technical communities overseas.

CECID's operation is primarily financed by R&D grants from the Innovation and Technology Commission of the Hong Kong Government for its two flagship research projects, namely Project Phoenix and Project Pyxis. In its completed Project Phoenix, CECID has produced several software packages that implement major ebXML specifications. These software packages include Hermes Message Service Handler, ebMail, and ebXMLRR Registry/Repository and are currently released under open source licenses on the freebXML.org website that CECID established in 2002. Commenced in 2004, Project Pyxis targets to develop enabling technology for e-business interoperability between trading partners and within large enterprises using various complementary and competing Web Services standards.
