= Toshio Yanagida =

Japanese biophysicist

- 柳田 敏雄
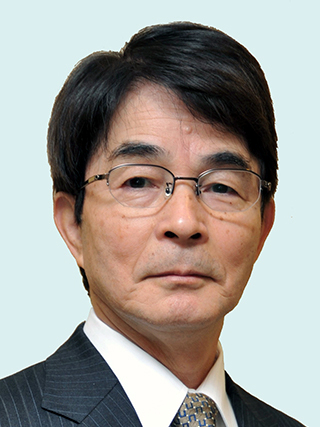
- Toshio Yanagida
- Education: Osaka University
- Known for: Single molecule fluorescence microscopy
- Awards: Imperial Prize of the Japan Academy (1998); Asahi Prize (1998)
- Scientific career
- Fields: Biophysics; Single Molecule Biology
- Workplaces: Osaka University; RIKEN
- Doctoral advisor: Fumio Oosawa

Toshio Yanagida (柳田 敏雄, Yanagida Toshio) (born 1946) is a Japanese biophysicist famous for his pioneer research in single molecule biology, and made important contributions to single molecule fluorescence microscopy.

== Contribution ==
Yanagida has been leading the development of single molecule detection techniques to study molecular motors, enzyme reactions, protein dynamics, and cell signaling since he succeeded in the direct observation of motion of single F-actin filaments in the presence of myosin in 1984. His single molecule experiments designed to investigate how thermal fluctuations (noise) play a positive role in the unique operation of biological molecular machines allowing for flexible and adaptive biological systems including muscle and brain.

== Biography ==
Yanagida was born in Hyogo, Japan, and received his doctorate in Engineering Science in 1976 from Osaka University. He was Professor of Bionics at the Faculty of Engineering Science, Osaka University from 1988 to 2010, and also Professor of Physiology at the Osaka University Medical School from 1996 to 2010, where he served as Dean from 2002 to 2004. After retiring from this position and becoming Professor Emeritus, he has been Specially Appointed Professor at the Graduate School of Frontier Biosciences, Osaka University and Director of RIKEN Quantitative Biology Center.

== Honors and awards ==
For his outstanding contributions, Yanagida received numerous honors and awards including the 1998 Imperial Prize of the Japan Academy, the 1998 Asahi Prize, and also the 2011 US Genomic Award for Outstanding Investigator in the Field of Single Molecule. He was selected as a Person of Cultural Merit by the Government of Japan in 2013 and a member of the Japan Academy by Japan Academy.
