= RIKEN MDGRAPE-3 =

Supercomputer system

RIKEN MDGRAPE-3 is an ultra-high performance petascale supercomputer system developed by the Riken research institute in Japan. It is a special purpose system built for molecular dynamics simulations, especially protein structure prediction.

MDGRAPE-3 consists of 201 units of 24 custom MDGRAPE-3 chips (4,824 total), plus additional dual-core Intel Xeon processors (codename "Dempsey") which serve as host machines.

In June 2006 Riken announced its completion, achieving the petaFLOPS level of floating point arithmetic performance. This was more than three times faster than the 2006 version of the IBM Blue Gene/L system, which then led the TOP500 list of supercomputers at 0.28 petaFLOPS. Because it's not a general-purpose machine capable of running the LINPACK benchmarks, MDGRAPE-3 does not qualify for the TOP500 list.

== See also ==
- Supercomputing in Japan
- MDGRAPE-4
