= CEN/TC 264 =

CEN/TC 264 (CEN Technical Committee 264) is a technical decision-making body within the CEN system working on standardization in the field of air quality in the European Union. Its goal is to develop functional standards, and methods for air quality characterisation of emissions, ambient air, indoor air, gases in and from the ground and deposition, in particular measurement methods for air pollutants (for example particles, gases, aerosols, odours, microorganisms), meteorological parameters and methods for determination of the efficiency of gas cleaning systems. Topics excluded from this WG are determination of limit values for air pollutants, workplaces and clean rooms and radioactive substances.

== Working groups ==
The Technical Committee 264 comprehends the following active working groups (WG):

- WG1: Emissions - Dioxins and PCB
- WG8: Emissions - Total mercury
- WG9: Emissions - Quality assurance of AMS
- WG11: Ambient air - Diffusive samplers
- WG12: Ambient air - VOCs/SO_{2}/NO_{2}/O_{3}/CO
- WG13: Ambient air - Ozone precursors and benzene
- WG15: Ambient air - PM10/PM2,5
- WG21: Ambient air - PAHs
- WG28:Ambient air and emissions - Bioaerosols
- WG30: Ambient air - Biomonitoring with flowering plants
- WG32: Ambient air - Particle number concentration
- WG33: Emissions - GHG in energy-intensive industries
- WG35: Ambient air - EC/OC
- WG38: Emissions - Diffuse VOC
- WG39: Ambient air - Airborne pollen grains and fungal spores
- WG40: Emissions - Formaldehyde
- WG41: Emissions and ambient air - Instrumental odour monitoring
- WG42: Ambient air - Air quality sensors
- WG43: Ambient air - Modelling quality objectives
- WG44: Ambient air - Source apportionment
- WG45: Emissions - Proficiency testing schemes
- WG46: Task Force Emissions
- WG47: Emissions - Diffuse emissions from building vents and roof openings
- WG48: Emissions & Ambient Air - Determination of PFAS

== See also ==
- List of CEN technical committees
- Air quality and EU legislation
