= MDGRAPE-4 =

Japanese supercomputer

MDGRAPE-4 is a supercomputer under development at the RIKEN Quantitative Biology Center (QBiC) in Suita, Osaka, Japan.

== See also ==
- RIKEN MDGRAPE-3
