= GXA =

GXA may refer to:

- GXA, ICAO airline code for Global Crossing Airlines, United States
- GXA, former ICAO airline code for Grixona, Moldova
- GXA, former FAA airport code for Grey Butte Field Airport, California
- GXA, shareholder of ZEP-RE, Kenyan insurance company
- GXA, XML markup language that extends SOAP
- GXA, former IATA airport code for Beringin Airport, Indonesia
- GXA, acronym for Global XML Web Services Architecture
