= OIOXML =

OIOXML is a project by the Danish government to develop a number of reusable data components serializable in various formats, although currently the only method of serialization for OIOXML data is in the XML format. This project was undertaken so as to ease communication from, to and between Danish governmental instances. It was made as part of the Danish government's transition to what they refer to as an eGovernment, in which communication between governmental instances, companies and the public should be paper-free. There has been some confusion as to what OIOXML is as the most prominent OIOXML format, the Danish Efaktura format which is a localization of UBL is also referred to as OIOXML by many governmental documents. It is currently a requirement for all invoices given to a Danish governmental organization to be in the Efaktura format.

== Sources ==
- The interoperability framework
- OIO - Offentlig Information Online (public information online) - english main page of the site
- Reference to the OIOXML markup language
- Validator for OIOXML
- Examples of OIOXML invoices in comparison with regular invoices (danish)
