= AgcXML =

agcXML is a set of extensible markup language (XML) schemas designed to automate and streamline the exchange of information during the building design and construction process. agcXML facilitates the electronic exchange of typical business information between different programs that would otherwise be exchanged in unstructured construction documents.

== Current state ==
As of February 2014, AGC re-focused on starting the schema development and adoption phase. AGC engaged the Burger Consulting Group(BCG) in Chicago to manage this process. To encourage collaboration with AGC and BCG, an Advisory Board composed of software vendors, contractors and AGC's IT Forum Steering committee members that work to determine and verify the direction of the agcXML PMO.

In October 2013, revisions to the existing schema Request for Information (RFI) and Change Order Directive began. The revisions to the alpha schema were completed on March 4, 2014 and a live RFI transaction demonstration was held at AGC's National Convention. The demonstration was a resounding success and the schema will now go onto the public review period. Progress still continues on the Change Order Directive with a public review period expected in May 2014.

== agcXML Industry Steward ==
In early 2013, AGC engaged Burger Consulting Group (BCG) as the agcXML Industry Steward for the agcXML initiative. In this capacity, BCG will, in coordination with AGC, act as the Project Management Office (PMO) working with contractors and construction software developers to accomplish easy data exchange and integrated systems using agcXML schema.

In this role, BCG is responsible for driving this initiative forward in a timely manner. They will be involved in all aspects of this project and will specifically provide guidance to both the agcXML Advisory Board and Application Workgroups, establish and clarify responsibilities for each group, track the project's progress to ensure its success, facilitate open and clear communications between all parties both internally and externally and ensure the project stays within budget.

Since 1994, BCG has been the premier provider of information technology and information systems management consulting to construction companies. Deeply experienced in the construction industry and familiar with the range of software applications in this sector, BCG remains completely vendor-independent making them an excellent choice as agcXML Industry Steward.

== History ==
The agcXML Project was an industry-wide initiative funded and led by the Associated General Contractors of America (AGC) and managed, under a contract with AGC, by the National Institute of Building Sciences. The goal of the project was to enable the efficient and reliable exchange of electronic construction project information among all building design and construction professionals. While building information modeling (BIM) is designed to facilitate the electronic exchange and the effective use of information about a building facility throughout the life cycle of a building facility, the agcXML Project focuses on transactional data — which may or may not be "building information" — that architects, engineers, contractors, subcontractors, material suppliers, and building owners typically exchange during the building design and construction process. Most of this information is still commonly exchanged in paper documents (or electronic equivalents of paper documents) such as owner/contractor agreements, schedules of values, requests for information (RFIs), requests for proposals (RFPs), architect/engineer supplemental instructions, change orders, change directives, submittals, applications for payment, and addenda, to name a few.

The project resulted in a set of extensible markup language (XML) schemas that will enable design and construction professionals to reliably exchange project information among dissimilar and proprietary software applications, without requiring the reengineering or redesign of those applications. The agcXML schemas established a common, non-proprietary data format and classification system. Software developers will be able to modify their applications with minimal effort to import and export data in agcXML format, without having to change or even share their proprietary software code and data formats. The schemas will remain the property of AGC, will be made publicly available and will be licensed at no cost and in perpetuity to any party for any legitimate purpose in support of the exchange of agcXML data. The project is coordinated with other data format standards development efforts worldwide to ensure the compatibility of agcXML data with those efforts.
