= Open Catalog Interface =

Computer software interface specification

Open Catalog Interface (OCI) is an open standard for a software interface developed by SAP for punch-out catalogs that connect buyers' procurement systems with suppliers' eCommerce systems. OCI is an alternative to cXML.

It is used by SAP Supplier Relationship Management, Microsoft Dynamics AX and other Enterprise resource planning and purchasing systems when connecting to external punch-out catalogs. In the open catalogue project Open Icecat, a separate OCI is defined for the exchange of multimedia data between multilingual product catalogs.

The OCI format is used to define the field mapping between the supplier's catalog and the SAP SRM shopping cart, to ensure that the data is transferred accurately and completely between source and receiver.
