= CEN/TC 125 =

European Union technical committee

CEN/TC 125 (CEN Technical Committee 125) is a technical decision making body within the CEN system working on standardization in the field of Masonry, including natural stone, in the European Union.
