= Classification Markup Language =

Classification Markup Language (ClaML) is an XML data format specification meant for the exchange of medical classifications, which are code numbers for of medical diagnoses and procedures.

The ClaML specification has first been published as Technical Specification CEN/TS 14463:2003, a 2007 revision of ClaML has been accepted as European Norm EN 14463:2007, which was replaced by ISO 13120:2013.

The ClaML standard has been prepared by Working Group 3 (Semantic Content) of the International Organization for Standardization's (ISO) Technical Committee (TC) on health informatics, known as ISO/TC 215 WG3.

ClaML has been adopted by the WHO to distribute their family of international classifications.

== Specifications availability ==
As a CEN standard, the ClaML specification is available from the various European national standardisation bodies, and can be found via the CEN website. The specification document includes the Document Type Definition (DTD). The DTD can be separately downloaded here DTD ClaML. An unofficial specification with example can be found here ClaML.
