= FundsXML =

Data standard for fund managers

- Filename extension: .xml
- Internet media type: application/xml
- Developed by: FundsXML.org (FundsXML Standards Committee)
- Initial release: December 8, 2003
- Latest release: 4.2.11
- Type of format: Data exchange format for investment fund data
- Open format?: Yes
- Website: www.fundsxml.org

FundsXML is an electronic XML-based data format for exchanging information about investment funds. It is used by fund management companies to deliver master data, prices, portfolio holdings and regulatory reporting data to distributors, depositaries, financial data vendor and authorities.

The format originated in 2001 as an initiative of German fund management companies. It is maintained by a consortium of fund companies, fund industry associations and service providers from several European countries and is free to use and royalty free.

== History ==
The first users, in 2001, were Allianz Global Investors, Credit Suisse Asset Management (Germany), DekaBank, DWS and Union Investment. They wanted to automate the delivery of fund data to data vendors, distributors and depositaries, which until then had largely relied on fax, e-mail and FTP in non-standard formats. The German fund association BVI joined the initiative in 2003 and announced in December of that year that it would introduce FundsXML as a standard among its member companies, with reporting to the Deutsche Bundesbank among the intended uses. At that time the group had ten founding members: seven investment companies, one asset management company, one software firm and the BVI. Version 1.0 was released on 8 December 2003.

In November 2006 the FundsXML Standards Committee admitted Oesterreichische Kontrollbank (OeKB), the Austrian fund association VÖIG (Vereinigung Österreichischer Investmentgesellschaften) and Erste-Sparinvest as members, bringing the Austrian fund industry on board. The committee then had 13 members from Germany, Austria, the Netherlands and Switzerland. The Dutch asset manager Robeco joined in April 2007, and FundsXML France was set up in 2008. Further French firms as well as Finesti of Luxembourg and Vontobel Fonds Services of Switzerland followed in late 2009. Version 3.0 of the schema was published on 30 October 2008. By early 2011 the current version was 3.0.3, and the BVI put the number of users at around 80 companies across Europe.

Version 4.0 gave the schema a modular structure and a dedicated section for regulatory reporting, including MiFID II, PRIIPs and Solvency II. It was presented at the BVI Fund Operations Conference in March 2017. Version 4.2.0, released in May 2022, added the fields of the European industry templates EMT (European MiFID Template), EPT (European PRIIPs Template), EET (European ESG Template) and TPT (Tripartite Template). Minor versions have been released regularly since; as of October 2026 the current version is 4.2.11.

== Organisation ==
The standard is maintained by FundsXML.org. Its decision-making body is the FundsXML Standards Committee (FSC), which decides on membership, sets up working groups and approves new versions. Members of the FSC are Erste Asset Management, OeKB and VÖIG from Austria, Finance Denmark, the French Association Française de la Gestion Financière (AFG), Allianz Global Investors, BVI, DekaBank, DWS and Union Investment from Germany, Kneip from Luxembourg, Robeco from the Netherlands and SIX Group from Switzerland. The BVI acts as secretary and VÖIG as deputy secretary. The German real estate research society gif lists FundsXML in its data management guideline as a joint standard of the fund associations of Denmark, Germany, Austria, France, Luxembourg and the Netherlands.

== Structure ==
A FundsXML document starts with the root element FundsXML4. The ControlData section holds information about the delivery itself: document identifier, creation timestamp, sender and schema version. Funds contains the actual fund data, both static information such as name, identifiers and share classes and date-dependent values such as net asset values, portfolio holdings and transactions. Securities and derivatives held in portfolios are described once under AssetMasterData and referenced from the positions by a unique identifier. Further sections are AssetMgmtCompanyDynData for statistics at the level of the management company, Documents for factsheets and similar material, RegulatoryReportings for reporting data and the industry templates mentioned above, and CountrySpecificData for national extensions.

Separating master data from transactional data, linked by security identifiers, is intended to keep the data volume of recurring deliveries small. The schema is defined as an XSD and published on GitHub together with sample files.

== Use ==
In Austria, management companies exchange portfolio data and regulatory reporting data in FundsXML via the Fondsdaten Portal operated by OeKB. The same platform carries the regulatory reporting of all Austrian funds to the Oesterreichische Nationalbank, both the aggregated ECB investment fund report and the security-by-security report. The BVI receives fund master data and other data deliveries from its members in FundsXML; the format is also used to exchange statements of assets between depositaries and management companies.
