= FicML =

- Filename extension: .ficml
- Internet media type: application/xml, text/xml, text/x-opml
- Latest release: 0.2
- Type of format: Fiction
- Extended from: XML

FicML (Fiction Markup Language) is an XML format for fictional stories (short stories, novellas, novels, etc.). Originally conceived of by multiple contributors, it is an initiative and is in the process of forming its first specification.

== XML format ==
The speculated XML elements in a typical FicML document are:

<ficml version="0.2">
This is the root element. It must contain the version attribute and one head and one body element.

<head>
Contains metadata. May include any of these optional elements: title, dateCreated, dateModified, authorName, authorEmail.

<body>
Contains the body of the story, the contents of the narrative. It must have one or more story elements.

<story>
Represents the general text of the fictional story. It may contain any number of arbitrary attributes. Common attributes include tense (as in past, present), voice (as in first or third person), and view (as in omniscient or limited).

<character>
Represents where characters appear within a narrative. It may have several attributes such as name, surname, nickname, and role.

<setting>
Represents where sections of a narrative take place. It may have several attributes such as name, type, alt. Setting tags can appear within other setting tags in order to illustrate a relationship. The setting of an apartment would be within the larger setting of a city or building.

== See also ==
- XML
- FictionBook
- Fiction
