= XML Script =

Term for two different XML-based standards

- Developer: DecisionSoft Limited
- First appeared: 20 October 1999; 25 years ago
- Stable release: X-Tract v2 (XPath) / 10 October 2002; 22 years ago
- OS: Windows; Linux
- Website: www.xmlscript.org

XML Script and XML-Script are two unrelated XML technologies. The former (XML Script) is an XML transformation language, while the latter (XML-Script) is a Microsoft technology preview for scripting web browsers, or an XML version of ECMA JavaScript. Microsoft is expected to rename XML-Script to Atlas Script before its first release.
