= Business-to-employee =

Business-to-employee (B2E) electronic commerce uses an intrabusiness network which allows companies to provide products and/or services to their employees. Typically, companies use B2E networks to automate employee-related corporate processes. B2E portals have to be compelling to the people who use them. Companies are competing for eyeballs of their employees with eBay, Yahoo and thousands of other web sites. A huge percentage of traffic to consumer web sites comes from people who are connecting to the net at the office.

Examples of B2E applications include:

- Online insurance policy management
- Corporate announcement dissemination
- Online supply requests
- Special employee offers
- Employee benefits reporting
- 401(k) Management
- Online loan services

== B2B ==
Business-to-business (B2B) is another type of e-commerce where the buyers and sellers are business organisations. It covers a broad spectrum of applications that enable an enterprise to form electronic relationships with its distributors, resellers, suppliers, customers, and other partners. Organisations can use B2B to restructure their supply chains and their partner relationships. It is also for the exchange of service information. E-procurement is one of the important parts of the business-to-business purchase and sale of supplies and services over the Internet. A central part of several B to B sites, e-procurement is sometimes referred to in other ways, such as supplier exchange.

== Consumer-to-business ==
Consumer-to-business model (C2B) is a type of commerce where a consumer or end user provides a product or service to an organization. It is a reverse of the Business to Consumer (B2C), where businesses produce products and services for consumer consumption. The idea is that the individual or end user provides a product or service that the business can use to complete a business process or gain competitive advantage.

== Portal ==
Portal is a term, generally synonymous with gateway, for a World Wide Web site that is or proposes to be a major starting site for users when they get connected to the Web or that users tend to visit as an anchor site. There are general portals and specialized or niche portals. Some major general portals include Yahoo, eBay and Microsoft Network.

== Consumer-to-consumer ==
Consumer-to-consumer e-commerce is the practice of individual consumers buying and selling goods via the Internet. The most common examples of this form of transaction comes from sales websites such as eBay, although online forums and classifieds also offer this type of commerce to consumers. In most cases, consumer to consumer e-commerce, also known as C2C e-commerce, is helped along by a third party who officiates the transaction to make sure goods are received and payments are made. This offers some protection for consumers partaking in C2C e-commerce, allowing them the chance to take advantage of the prices offered by motivated sellers.

There are four different types of e-commerce, or electronic commerce, which is the buying and selling of goods or services through the use of computer technology and Internet service. Electronic commerce can take place between businesses, which may refer to either business to commerce, or between consumers and businesses, which may refer to either business to business commerce e-commerce or consumer to business e-commerce. The final type is consumer to consumer e-commerce which take businesses out of the picture and allows for transactions to take place between consumers via the Internet.

== Business-to-consumer ==
Business-to-consumer refers to commercial transactions where businesses sell products or services to consumers. This might refer to individuals shopping for clothes for themselves in physical store, eating at a restaurant, or subscribing to a service at home. More recently, the term B2C refers to the online selling of products in which manufacturers or retailers sell their products to consumers over the Internet.

== E-commerce ==
Electronic commerce or e-commerce is a term for any type of business, or commercial transaction, which includes the transfer of information across the Internet. It covers a range of different types of businesses, from buyer based retail sites, through sale or music sites, to business exchanges trading goods and services among companies. It is currently one of the most important features of the Internet to develop. The development of e-commerce has proceeded in phases. Offline and online brands initially were kept distinct and then were awkwardly merged. Initial e-commerce efforts consisted of flashy brochure sites, with rudimentary shopping carts and accelerated checkouts.

== See also ==
- e-business
- Business-to-consumer
- Business-to-business
