= Biological Dynamics Markup Language =

Biological Dynamics Markup Language (BDML) is an XML format for quantitative data describing biological dynamics. It was developed by the Shuichi Onami team at RIKEN QBiC.

The Onami lab hosts the Systems Science of Biological Dynamics (SSBD) database.
