= Many-to-many =

Many-to-many communication occurs when information is shared between groups. Members of a group receive information from multiple senders.

Wikis are a type of many-to-many communication, where multiple editors collaborate to create content that is disseminated among a wide audience. Video conferencing, online gaming, chat rooms, and internet forums are also types of many-to-many communication.

== See also ==
- Point-to-point (telecommunications)
- Point-to-multipoint communication
