= LOGML =

Markup language

LOGML is an XML 1.0–based markup language for web server log reports, that allows automated data mining and report generation. LOGML is based on XGMML for graph description.

== See also ==
- XGMML
- List of markup languages
