= RIKEN Quantitative Biology Center =

Japanese research center

Coordinates: 34.8105°N 135.5153°E

The Quantitative Biology Center (QBiC) is a Strategic Research Center of the Japanese national research and development institute, Riken. In November 2014, they succeeded in making a translucent mouse in order to see its internal organs more clearly.

== Overview ==
QBiC is a systems biology research center. The center is led by director Toshio Yanagida and is divided into three research cores.

- Cell Dynamics Research Core
- Computational Biology Research Core
- Cell Design Research Core

== Research Cores ==
=== Cell Dynamics Research Core ===
The Cell Dynamics Research Core houses the Laboratory for Cell Polarity Regulation, led by Yasushi Okada. Okada reported the first visualization of Mitochondrial Derived Vesicles (MDV) from mitochondrial protrusions using ultrafast super-resolution fluorescence imaging with spinning disk confocal microscope optics. This core also includes Shuichi Onami's Laboratory for Developmental Dynamics creator of the Biological Dynamics Markup Language (BDML). The Onami lab hosts the Systems Science of Biological Dynamics (SSBD) database.

=== Computational Biology Research Core ===
The Computational Biology Research Core is a user of the K computer and developer of the MDGRAPE-4 supercomputer.

=== Cell Design Research Core ===
The Cell Design Research Core houses the Laboratory for Synthetic Biology which reported the see-through mouse. This core is also notable for housing Yoshihiro Shimizu's Laboratory for Cell-Free Protein Synthesis, developer of the PURE cell free protein expression system. Yo Takana's Laboratory for Integrated Biodevice, which created a battery from the electric organ of a torpedo ray.
