= Peter Meirs =

Peter Meirs is the Vice President of Production Technologies for Time Inc. and an affiliate of the MIT Media Lab.

Meirs was a founding member of the PRISM XML standard working group.

He was a 2012 recipient of the IDEAlliance Luminaire award.
