= DisplayML =

DisplayML is an open, free-to-use protocol for encoding display information for display devices. It is based upon XML messages with a Request/Response model where the display device works as the server.

The interface between systems and display devices has historically required encoded character strings which, though successful, can lead to complexity in creation and debugging. DisplayML is easy to understand, since XML is a human reada-le format. The protocol is applicable to numerous display devices using various technologies such as LED, LCD, Bi-stable Magnetic, flip-disc display, VGA etc.

DisplayML does not handle security. The protocol can be implemented at different levels depending on the type of display.

The DisplayML protocol supports file transfer, which makes it possible to send fonts, pictures or software to displays.
