= EPPML =

EPPML (Extensible Postal Product Model and Language) is a conceptual model for the interactions between parties of a postal communication system. Examples of such parties are mailers, posts, mail aggregators, providers of postal services and equipment and recipients. They create, publish, consume and deliver postal products.

The central concept of EPPML is the postal product. EPPML defines the structure and meaning for the information that represents a postal product. The postal product definition may be viewed as an interface between posts, their customers and other parties. The formal representation of postal products allows automated systems to efficiently consume new postal products as they are introduced by postal operators.

The current implementation of EPPML is based on XML technology, but the EPPML concepts may be implemented with other technologies (e.g. relational databases, semantic web). Each postal product is fully represented by one (and only one) postal product definition file (PPDF) which is an XML document. A PPDF must be valid under the EPPML schema.

== EPPML as a model of interaction ==
The 'M' in EPPML stands for Model. EPPML was defined by its authors as a model for the interaction between parties that create, publish, consume or deliver postal products.
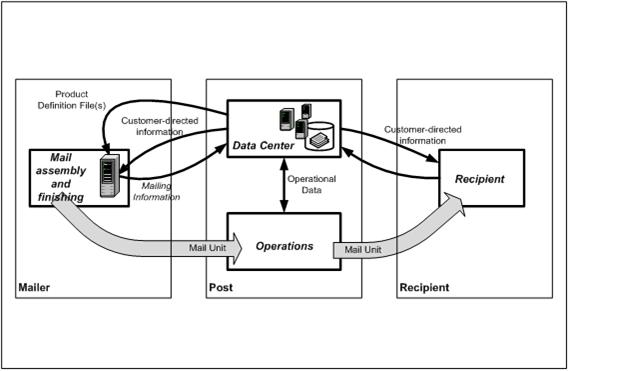
The interactions defined by the model include actions on physical items, information exchanges and financial transactions. The typical action on a physical item is a change of location (e.g. delivery). The information exchanges may use either electronic channels (e.g. web services, email) or physical channels (e.g. bar codes printed on mail items by mailers and read posts). An example of a financial transaction is a refund for late delivery of a mail item.

== EPPML as a markup language ==
The first practical implementation of EPPML relies on an XML schema to define the structure of the information that describes each postal product. The use of the XML schema makes EPPML a markup language for defining postal products. This is the reason why EPPML is sometimes referred to as Extensible Postal Product Markup Language.

== Postal Product Definition File (PPDF) ==
A postal product definition file (PPDF) is an XML document which fully describes a postal product. The PPDF contains all necessary and sufficient information for customers to purchase and use the product. The structure and meaning of the XML elements in a PPDF is defined by an XML schema, known as EPPML schema.

== EPPML Schema ==
The EPPML schema is an XML Schema which provides sufficient information for postal operators to generate postal product definition files to describe all aspects of their postal products, both existing and new. The EPPML schema also provides information necessary and sufficient for mailing equipment providers to create automated mailing systems capable of using postal product definition files for all mailer's activities, including postal product selection, the production of mail units compatible with new postal products and requesting new features of postal products.

The EPPML schema is a Universal Postal Union standard, UPU S54. The standard contains a complete description of the EPPML schema, its hierarchical structure, information types and semantics of its elements.
