= Business Partner Network =

The Business Partner Network (BPN) is the single source for vendor data for the United States Federal Government.
