= XSIL =

Transport language

XSIL (Extensible Scientific Interchange Language) is an XML-based transport language for scientific data, supporting the inclusion of both in-file data and metadata. The language comes with an extensible Java object model. The language's elementary objects include Param (arbitrary association between a keyword and a value), Array, Table (a set of column headings followed by a set of records), and Stream, which enables one to either encapsulate data inside the XSIL file or point to an external data source.

BFD is an XML dialect based on XSIL.
