= Binary Format Description language =

The Binary Format Description (BFD) language was based on the XSIL, an XML-based language for scientific data processing. BFD used XSLT to transform descriptions of binary data into arbitrary XML representations. Similar approaches were used by systems such as BinX, which describe the structure and physical layout of binary files in order to generate XML output.
