= DCML (markup language) =

XML-based markup language

Data Center Markup Language (DCML) is an XML-based markup language which provides a means for describing data center environments such as dependencies between data center components and managerial policies governing those environments with an open, vendor-neutral language.

DCML can be used to, for example, link a server provisioning system with a server monitoring system so that when a new server is provisioned, it is also automatically monitored. The DCML document transmitted to the monitoring system in this instance would include information about the machine's IP address and any special ports and services running on the machine that are to be monitored. The DCML document would also contain information about what application the server belongs to and whom to contact, as well as how to contact them, when it goes down. This information is imported into the system that is available to NOC personnel for consultation when an alert occurs.

DCML is being developed by the Data Center Markup Language Interest Group in conjunction with OASIS. In 2004 it was still in its early stages of development in draft form.
