= J2K-Codec =

- Original author(s): Alex Saveliev
- Initial release: 12 March 2005
- Stable release: 2.0 / 12 April 2011; 13 years ago
- Written in: C++
- Operating system: Windows
- Platform: x86, x86-64
- Type: graphic software
- License: closed source
- Website: www.j2k-codec.com

J2K-Codec is a commercial library to decode JPEG 2000 images. Version 2.0 was released on 12 April 2011.

J2K-Codec supports decoding of different resolution levels and selective tile decoding. It also supports files, produced by ADV202/ADV212 hardware chips.

The library is faster than JasPer or OpenJPEG libraries and has approximately the same decoding speed as Kakadu .

== See also ==
- OpenJPEG
- JasPer
- Kakadu library
