= J2K =

J2K may refer to:

- JPEG 2000, the image compression standard
- J2K-Codec, a proprietary library to decode JPEG 2000 images
- The US Coast Guard designation for the Fairchild 24 light transport aircraft
- Josh Young, former member of Flosstradamus, a musical duo
- Jason Black, member of Roll Deep, an English grime (music) crew
