= Fann =

Fann or FANN may refer to:

== People ==
- Al Fann (1925-2018), American actor and producer, known for Stop! Or My Mom Will Shoot
- Chad Fann (born 1970), American former football player
- Fuoco B. Fann, American cultural theorist
- Karen Fann (born 1954), American politician
- Ryan Fann, American Paralympic athlete
- Fann Wong (born 1971), Singaporean actress

== Other uses ==
- Fann Mountains, a mountain range in Sughd Province, Tajikistan
- Fast Artificial Neural Network (FANN), a cross-platforming programming library

== See also ==
- Fan (disambiguation)
