= Label (disambiguation) =

A label is any kind of tag attached to something so as to identify the object or its content. It may refer to:

- Label, an identifier
- Labelling, describing someone or something in a word or short phrase
- Record label

== Physical tags ==
- Clothing label, referring either to a clothing brand, or to a physical tag on clothing
- Museum label, for exhibitions in museums
- Packaging and labelling, in industry

== Arts, entertainment, and media ==
- Label (TV series), an Indian web series
- Labels, a 1930 travel book by Evelyn Waugh
- "Labels", a song by GZA on the album Liquid Swords
- Labels, a French record label created by Virgin Records, later a division of EMI Music France absorbed now into Warner Music.
- Record label, a brand and a trademark associated with the marketing of music recordings and music videos
- "Labels" (Dexter's Laboratory), an episode of Dexter's Laboratory
- The Label (book), a 2007 book by Gary Marmorstein, about the rise of Columbia Records
- The Label (video game publisher), a video game publisher acquired by Team17

== Science and technology ==
=== Computing ===
- Label (command), a shell command
- Label (control), a component of user interfaces
- Label (computer science)
- Tape label, human and/or machine readable metadata used by tape storage equipment
- Label, in machine learning, a desired output for a given input in a dataset
- Automatic label placement, computer methods of placing labels automatically on a map or chart
- Labels, the parts of a domain name that are not "dots"
- Revision tag, a textual label associated with a specific revision of a project

=== Other uses in science and technology ===
- Isotopic labeling, a technique for tracking the passage of a sample of substance through a system
- Labeling theory, or social reaction theory, a theory in sociology which ascribes labelling of people to control and identification of deviant behavior

== Other uses ==
- Label (heraldry), a charge closely resembling the strap with pendants which, from the saddle, crossed the horse's chest
- Label, an older term for a long thin device, in particular, a ruler as on an astrolabe, circumferentor, or similar instrument
- Label mould or hood mould, architectural moulding above windows to throw-off rainwater
- Labeling (map design), or cartographic labeling, a form of typography that strongly deals with form, style, weight and size of type on a map
- The Label language, an Oceanic language spoken in Papua New Guinea
- Label (philately)

== See also ==
- Black Label (disambiguation)
- Labeling (disambiguation)
- white label record
