= JP2 =

JP-2 or jp2 may refer to:

- Pope John Paul II, pope of the Catholic Church from 1978 to 2005
- JP-2, a type of military jet fuel
- .jp2, the file extension for JPEG 2000 files
- JP-2, a genotype of Phytophthora infestans
- The Lost World: Jurassic Park
