= DLD =

DLD can refer to:

- Data Retention Directive in Norwegian (Datalagringsdirektivet)
- Democratic League of Dardania, a political party in Kosovo
- Demon Lord Dante, an anime and manga series
- Deutsche Linux-Distribution (German Linux Distribution), a Linux distribution produced from 1992 to 1999
- Dihydrolipoamide dehydrogenase
- Digital Life Design, a conference network
- DLD (software), a library package for the C programming language that performs dynamic link editing
- Geilo Airport, Dagali, IATA code DLD
- Developmental language disorder
- DLD (band), Mexican rock band
