= Relaxation labelling =

Relaxation labelling is an image treatment methodology. Its goal is to associate a label to the pixels of a given image or nodes of a given graph.

== See also ==
- Digital image processing
