= Labeling (disambiguation) =

Labelling or labeling is describing someone or something in a word or short phrase.

Labeling may also refer to:

- Labeling, a piece of paper, plastic film, cloth, metal, or other material affixed to a container or product on which is written or printed information or symbols about the product
- Package labeling
  - Food labelling
- Labeling theory, in sociology
- Isotopic labeling
- Typography (cartography), also known as map labeling, placing text on maps
  - Automatic label placement, the computational algorithms for automating map labeling

== See also ==
- Label (disambiguation)
- Label printer
