= Grok (JPEG 2000) =

JPEG 2000 image encoder and decoder

- Developer: Aaron Boxer
- Release: January 1, 2016; 10 years ago
- Stable release: 20.4.17 / 15 October 2026; 1 day ago
- Written in: C++
- Operating system: macOS, Windows, POSIX
- Platform: x86-64, AArch64
- Predecessor: libopenjp2
- Available in: English
- Type: Graphics software
- License: AGPL v3
- Website: github.com/GrokImageCompression/grok/wiki
- Repository: github.com/GrokImageCompression/grok

Grok is a computer software library to encode and decode images in the JPEG 2000 format. It is designed for stability, high performance, and low memory usage. Grok is free and open-source software released under the GNU Affero General Public License (AGPL) version 3.

Grok was forked from OpenJPEG's libopenjp2 in April 2016 by Aaron Boxer under a copyleft license. One of his goals was to close the performance gap with the more efficient but proprietary Kakadu. Grok fully implements the ISO/IEC 15444-1 technical standard. As of 2024, the newer, complexity-reduced High-Throughput JPEG 2000 standard (HTJ2K, ISO/IEC 15444-15, ITU-T T.814) has been implemented, with both encoding and decoding support available.

== Features ==
- support for High-Throughput JPEG 2000 (HTJ2K) encode/decode
- full encode/decode support for ICC colour profiles
- full encode/decode support for XML, IPTC, XMP and Exif meta-data
- full encode/decode support for monochrome, sRGB, palette, YCC, extended YCC, CIELab and CMYK colour spaces
- full encode/decode support for JPEG, PNG, BMP, TIFF, RAW, PNM and PAM image formats
- full encode/decode support for 1–16 bit precision images
- supported platforms: Linux x86-64, Linux AArch64, Windows, macOS and WebAssembly

== Integration ==
Grok has been integrated into a number of other open source projects, including:

- Cantaloupe image server
- IIPSrv image server
- Horos medical image viewer
