= Free boundary condition =

In image processing, the free boundary condition is the convention used when applying a convolution kernel to a digital image in which pixel locations that lie outside the image boundaries are interpreted as having a value of zero. The question of what value to assign out-of-bounds pixels may arise, for instance, when applying a 3×3 kernel to the corner pixel in an image.
