= Analog image processing =

Analog image processing is the use of an optical computer to process physical, optical images formed by light waves coming from an object, as opposed to the digital image processing and its use of digital computers to process pixelated, digital images. Correspondingly, a range of digital image processing techniques possess direct physical analogs. For example, fast Fourier transform algorithms are commonly implemented in digital phase correlation and other digital image processing techniques. These digital Fourier transforms can be considered to be the digitized approximation of methods utilizing Fourier transforming properties of an ideal lens.
