= PhotoFiltre =

Shareware image editing software

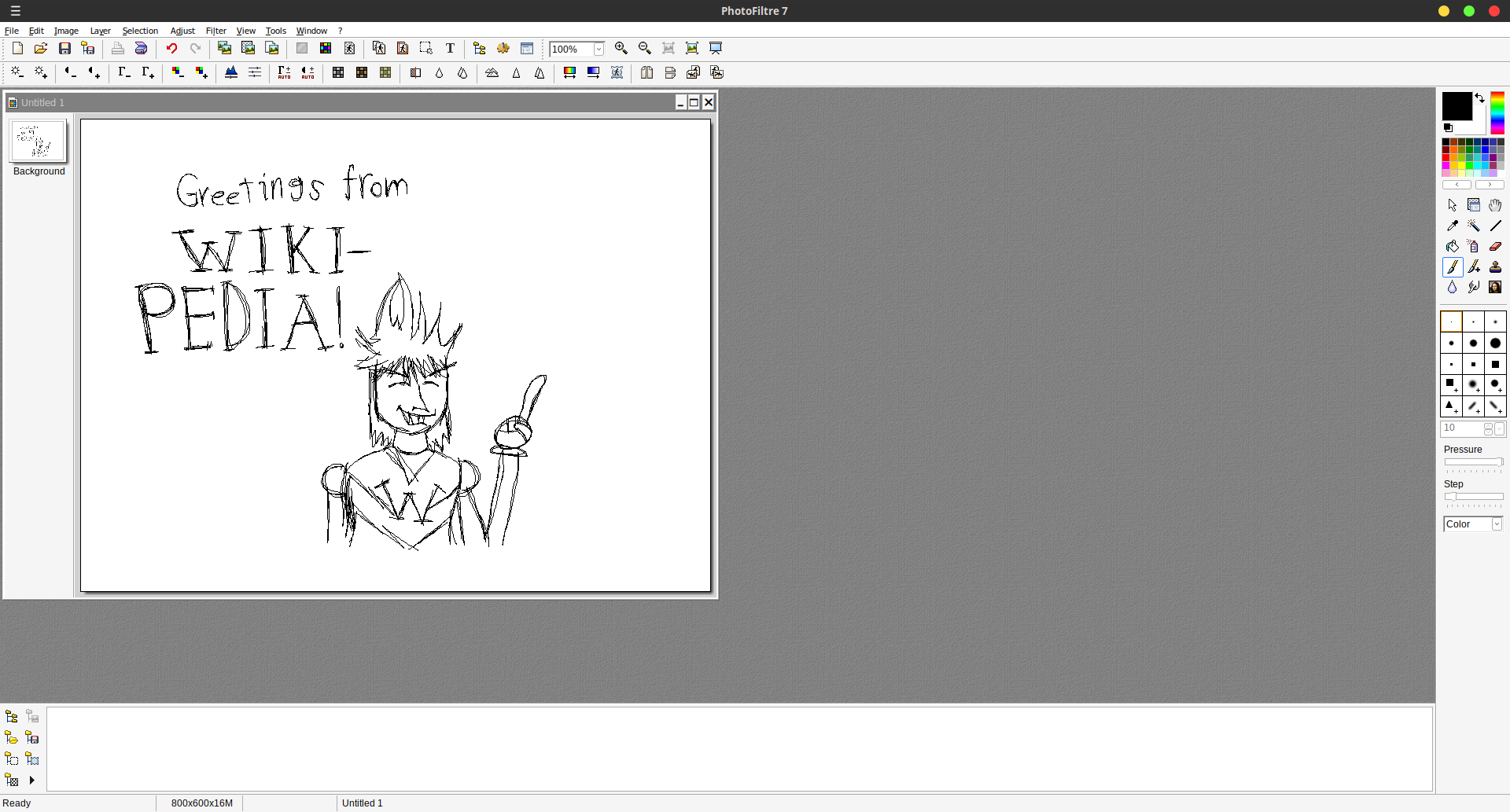
- An image of a drawing of an unofficial Wikipedia mascot named "Wiki-Wiki" with "Greetings from WIKIPEDIA!" written over him. created in the latest freeware version of PhotoFiltre (7.2.1)
- Developer: Antonio Da Cruz
- Stable release: PhotoFiltre 11.6.0 / 2024 March 15; 2 years ago
- Available in: French, English, ...
- Type: Raster graphics editor
- License: Proprietary
- Website: www.photofiltre-studio.com

PhotoFiltre is a shareware image editing and effects program published by Antonio Da Cruz. It is considered to be a portable application.

Reviewers have praised PhotoFiltre for its simplicity and interface compared to more complex and resource-heavy image editing programs.

Other reviews:

== Features ==
PhotoFiltre has some similar features to Microsoft Paint, albeit with some new features, which are:

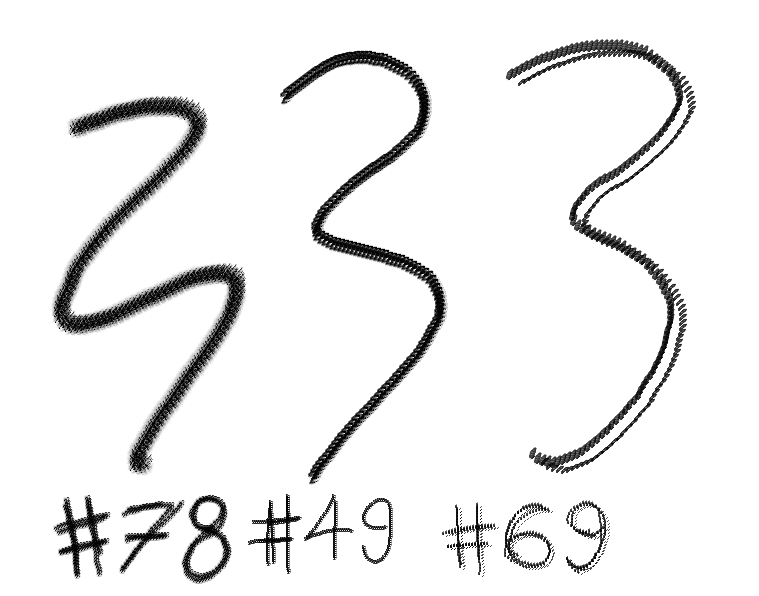
- Comparisons of 3 Advanced Paintbrush textures, from left to right: Texture #78, texture #49 and texture #69.
  Advanced Paintbrush, which has 8 textures to choose from.
- Magic Wand, which automatically selects the drawing that was clicked
- Clone Stamp Tool, which clones a drawing when the control key is pressed.
- Blur, which blurs the drawing.
- Smudge, which applies a smudge effect on the drawing.
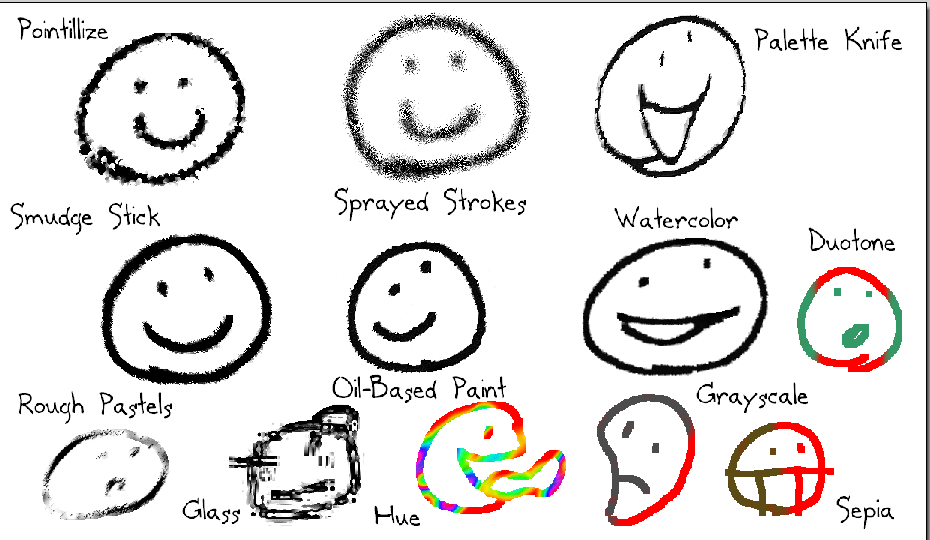
- Comparisons of all Artistic Paintbrush effects with smiley faces for reference, from left to right; top to bottom: Pointillize, Sprayed Strokes, Palette Knife, Smudge Stick, Oil-Based Paint, Watercolor, Duotone, Rough Pastels, Glass, Hue, Grayscale and Sepia.
  Artistic Paintbrush, which applies effects to drawings.
