= Photodex =

Photodex Corporation
- Type: Private
- Founded: 1987
- Headquarters: Austin, TX, USA
- Key people: Paul Schmidt (President)
- Products: ProShow Gold; ProShow Producer; ProShow Web
- Website: photodex.com

Photodex was a software company specializing in the digital imaging market, primarily known for its ProShow product line, a photo slideshow software. The company announced in January 2020 it was shutting down it servers as of January 31, 2020.

Photodex released one of the first consumer level slideshow programs in 1991 with a program named GDS, for Graphic Display System. In the mid-1990s they focused on the photo management software product CompuPic, which also included slideshow capability. In 2002 they released the first version of ProShow, which focused primarily on slideshow creation.

== Products ==
Photodex's primary products were its ProShow line, consisting of ProShow Gold, ProShow Producer, and ProShow Web.

=== ProShow Gold ===
ProShow Gold is a consumer-level tool for creating slideshows from photos, video clips, and music. Built-in features allow users to customize slideshows with transitions, slide styles, and motion effects in the style of the Ken Burns Effect. The software also has built-in CD, DVD and Blu-ray burning capabilities and outputs to other formats including MPEG video, QuickTime video, Flash Video, Facebook, Vimeo, and YouTube.

In 2006, USA Today writer Jefferson Graham named ProShow Gold “the best program for mixing pictures and video clips.”

PC Magazine named ProShow Gold the Editors' Choice for creating slideshows.

=== ProShow Producer ===
ProShow Producer was professional-grade slideshow software for creating photo and video slideshows. Features including keyframing, masking and adjustment effects can be used for further customization. The software had built-in CD, DVD and Blu-ray burning capabilities. It also supported output to an Executable file (.exe) for playing on most computers (excluding Apple) as well as to other formats including MPEG video, HTML5 video, QuickTime video, Flash Video, Facebook, Vimeo and YouTube.

Beginners used the built-in Wizard to create a slideshow even without prior experience with the application. After supplying the Wizard with the slideshow material (images, videos and/or audio files) ProShow Producer will create the slideshow automatically. After that, users can further customize their project and easily share it on popular sites such as YouTube and Facebook.

On Dec. 5th 2013, FileCluster.com reviewed ProShow Producer and rated it with 5 stars.

=== ProShow Web ===
ProShow Web automatically creates video slideshows online from a user's photos, video clips and music. Finished shows can be shared online through social networking sites including Facebook and YouTube or downloaded to a user's computer.
