= Media player =

Media player may refer to:

- Digital media player, home appliances that play digital media
- Media Player Classic, open source software that plays digital media on computers running the Microsoft Windows operating system
- Media player software, software that plays digital media
- Portable media player, portable hardware that plays digital media
- Windows Media Player, software that plays digital media included in Windows
  - Windows Media Player (2022), also referred to as Media Player, media player software included in Windows 10 and Windows 11 replacing Groove Music
