= David Taubman =

David Taubman is an electrical engineer at the University of New South Wales in Sydney, Australia. He was named a Fellow of the Institute of Electrical and Electronics Engineers (IEEE) in 2015 for his contributions to image and video communications. He was elected a Fellow of the Australian Academy of Technological Sciences and Engineering (FTSE) in 2023.

== Education ==
- Ph.D. in Electrical Engineering, University of California, Berkeley, 1994
- M.Sc. in Electrical Engineering, University of California at Berkeley, 1992
- B.E. (Medal) in Electrical Engineering, University of Sydney, 1988
- B.Sc. in Mathematics and Computer Science, University of Sydney, 1986
