= Adns =

- Developer: Ian Jackson
- Stable release: 1.6.0 / June 11, 2020; 5 years ago
- Written in: C
- Operating system: GNU/Linux, BSD, macOS
- Type: DNS resolver
- License: GNU General Public License v3.0 or later
- Website: https://www.gnu.org/software/adns/
- Repository: www.chiark.greenend.org.uk/ucgi/~ianmdlvl/git/adns.git/

GNU adns is a C library that provides easy-to-use DNS resolution functionality. The library is asynchronous, allowing several concurrent calls. The package also includes several command-line utilities for use in scripts.
