= Clothing label =

Clothing label may refer to:

- A clothing brand
- A physical textile labeling on garments
- A wash care label on garments
