= The Label (book) =

2007 book by Gary Marmorstein

- Book cover, first edition
- Author: Gary Marmorstein
- Language: English
- Publisher: Da Capo Press
- Publication date: 27 February 2007
- ISBN: 978-1560257073

The Label: The Story of Columbia Records is a 2007 book by Gary Marmorstein, about the rise of Columbia Records. It covers how it made its way from the beginning: from signing its own artists, to making them celebrities.
