= JasPer =

Free software

- Original author(s): The University of British Columbia, Michael David Adams, Image Power, Inc.
- Initial release: 1999
- Stable release: 4.2.5 / 26 March 2025; 1 day ago
- Repository: github.com/mdadams/jasper
- Operating system: OSX, Windows, POSIX
- Available in: C
- Type: graphic software
- License: JasPer License Version 2.0
- Website: www.ece.uvic.ca/~mdadams/jasper/

JasPer is a computer software project to create a reference implementation of the codec specified in the JPEG-2000 Part-1 standard (i.e. ISO/IEC 15444-1) - started in 1997 at Image Power Inc. and at the University of British Columbia. It consists of a C library and some sample applications useful for testing the codec.

The copyright owner began licensing the code to the public under an MIT License-style license in 2004 in response to requests from the open-source community. As of 2011 JasPer operated as a component of many software projects, both free and proprietary, including (but not limited to) netpbm (as of release 10.12), ImageMagick and KDE (as of version 3.2). As of 22 June 2010 the GEGL graphics library supported JasPer in its latest Git versions.

In a series of objective JPEG-2000-compression quality tests conducted in 2004, "JasPer was the best codec, closely followed by IrfanView and Kakadu". However, Jasper remains one of the slowest implementations of the JPEG-2000 codec, as it was designed for reference, not performance.

== Etymology ==
The name "JasPer" has simultaneous connotations with Canada's Jasper National Park, with the semi-precious gemstone, jasper, and with "JP" as an abbreviation of the JPEG-2000 standard.

== See also ==
- OpenJPEG
