= Fuoco B. Fann =

Fuoco B. Fann is a post-structuralist and cultural theorist. He is noted for synthesizing Post-structuralism with American Literary Criticism, Intercultural Philosophy, and Material Culture Studies. He taught at Lanzhou Jiaotong University, China before moving in 1989 to the United States, where he guest-lectured at California State University, East Bay and UC Davis, and has since resided in California. Fann currently guest lectures at UC Berkeley. Fann's monograph on post-structuralism and intercultural philosophy, This Self We Deserve: A Quest after Modernity, was published in 2020.

== Works ==
=== Post-structuralism, Intercultural Philosophy, and Continental Philosophy ===
The novelty of Fann's work demonstrates four main unprecedented arguments: (1) Our current social conditions resulted from our knowledge structure. Modern knowledge seems to have lost its certainty and become precarious, an instability that results from a continuous "modern tradition" of thought that, in our time, "makes us malfunction in everyday life," and implicates many aspects of societies. (2) This instability of knowledge is compounded by the "modern phonetic language": while language in general is a copy of things, Fann demonstrates that phonetic-alphabetic language is a copy of a copy. Since phonetic writing copies the sounds of speech which in turn refer to ideas of things, in Foucault's words, alphabetic writing demands that "we place ourselves in the virtual space of self-representation and reduplication," and in its modern form, Fann argues, phonetic language "creates an abyss between self and reality whose edge can never be reached." (3) In this problematic "modern tradition," the foundational aphorism of western rationality, René Descartes's famed "Cogito, ergo sum ('I think, therefore I am', has reversed today into "We think, therefore We are". This original constellation of Fann's claims is indeed the first to formulate this specific coinage (We think, therefore we are") as a direct inversion of Descartes, and to link it explicitly to: the disconnection between "I think" and "I am" in modern epistemology; the collective conformity to shared values (freedom, equality, power) and consumer symbols; and the dissolution of Weberian methodological individualism. No major figure in the Western canon—neither Hegel (who gave us the "we" of Spirit), nor Heidegger (who gave us the "they" of das Man), nor Adorno (who critiqued the culture industry), nor Foucault (who announced the "death of man")—has formulated this precise inversion as a reversal of the Cartesian cogito. (4) Citing G.W.F. Hegel's thesis from The Philosophy of History that throughout history "the superior principle overcame the inferior," and displaying Hegel's derogatory remarks against Blacks in Africa—including accusations of cannibalism —and excluding "immovable" empires of Asia out of "the History of the World", Fann suggests that the "teleological, linear, and progressive Hegelian... conception of History" amounts to "ontological violence." Fann has been acknowledged as the first scholar to clearly articulate these four contentions together, suggesting that the Modern Imperial domination is deeply abetted by "Hegelian metaphysics and ethnocentrism." Fann's originality is not in the discovery of Hegel's racism, but in coining the term "ontological violence," and its integration with his larger project of reversing the Cartesian cogito.

Inspired by French poststructuralists Michel Foucault, Jacques Derrida, Jean-François Lyotard, Jean Baudrillard, and continental philosophy, Fann opens in This Self We Deserve with Foucault's account in The Order of Things: An Archaeology of the Human Sciences of a rupture in Western knowledge around the turn of the nineteenth century. The traditionally established Christian worldview disintegrated and modern knowledge became fragmented; "modern man" emerged for the first time in history as an object of knowledge and also as a knowing subject. This subject is an "anthropocentric structurally overloaded subject" who is possessed by a futile "will to truth," seeking self-certainty amid already-uncertain knowledge. Fann asserts that any of us may be Foucault's modern subject:

Modernity—based on a paradoxical uncertainty (aporia) of the world but a logical certainty of modern knowledge—gives the modern speaking subject, the knowing subject—all of us—a power so that we can do the impossible. The impossible is that Man replaces God. This replacement, of course, uses not religion but the idea of modern knowledge.

Fann argues that we, as modern subjects, have been misled by Max Weber's celebration of Occidental "methodological individualism" to believe that "values are self-chosen and not grounded in a larger cosmic scheme." The "self-consciousness of one's freedom to power," which "is the paramount premise of the conception of modernity," is a pretentious modern fiction. Addressing Descartes's "Cogito, ergo sum" ('I think, therefore I am'), Fann draws from Foucault's contention that our modern épistémè is characterized by a "double movement proper to the modern cogito [which] explains why the 'I think' does not, in its case, lead to the evident truth of the 'I am.'" If "I think" is uncoupled from "I am," Fann elaborates, "the best argument is that 'I am' has disappeared and reappeared as 'We are'.... The fundamental ramification of [modern] thought is: we think, therefore we are. I no longer think but we think." Demonstrating that "we have become more artificially rational than ever before," Fann observes that the knowing subject, empowered as the individual, nevertheless believes in the same values as everyone else (freedom, equality, and personal power), belongs to a larger system of "artificial rationalization" that "[replaces] the human will and mental and physical power," and participates in the same processes of consumption (in Baudrillard, a systematic manipulation of objects-as-signs) that everyone else does. "We are no longer destined to be a specific 'individual' but to be 'individuals,'" hence individualism is undermined. By analyzing literary works such as Shakespeare's Hamlet, Flaubert's Madame Bovary, and James Joyce's use of stream of consciousness, Fann suggests that the "modern phonetic language" theorized by Foucault takes on its own life as an "inner narrative of self." Fann examines the history of Chinese-European encounter to demonstrate that philosophers such as Vico and Hegel attributed what Foucault termed an "ontological status" to Western phonetic languages as opposed to Chinese script. Derrida would later create the term "logocentrism" to describe "the metaphysics of phonetic writing" which was always "nothing but the most original and powerful ethnocentrism." According to sinologist John Lagerwey, since phonetic writing copies the sound of speech,

As Jacques Derrida well demonstrated, our civilization of Writing in reality is a civilization of Speech. It is through using a phonetic writing that we have been led to see in writing a simple duplication of the "living voice": speech—whether of man or God—has the power to create things, or to realize them; it alone can express the essence—the intention, the will—and it was thus naturally identified with what gives life, with the spirit, with the soul, and with the breath. "Writing," writes Derrida, "the letter, the sensible inscription, has always been considered by Western tradition as the body and matter external to the spirit, to breath, to speech, and to the logos."

Fann argues that this ontological status of phonetic language is problematic for many reasons. On the personal level, "the inner narrative of self creates an abyss between self and reality whose edge can never be reached." The ethnocentrism of the Western view of writing also has political consequences. Emmanuel Lévinas referred to Western philosophy as a form of "ontological imperialism" that reduplicates European colonialism; Derrida termed Western metaphysics "white mythology"; while for Baudrillard "History itself is a product for Western export."

Kirkus Reviews states: "To understand the present, [Fann] seems to assert, readers must first expand their scope; only then can they begin to investigate the past." This Self We Deserve unfolds a variety of reversals: of artistic modernism (represented by Munch's The Scream) into postmodernism (represented by Warhol and Koons); of traditional consumption into "post-consumption" (for Baudrillard, the participation in a sign system of objects); of Western aesthetics into "post-aesthetics"; and of First World nations into States of Indebtedness. Fann apprises the danger of the Hegelian ethnocentric view of history as a linear progression of "the superior principle [overcoming] the inferior." Rather than considering the worlds in terms of dialectical conflict, Fann envisions the worlds fusing in the cultural diversity of mutual interdependence and reversibility. Fann's notable term “reversibility" suggests something more specific drawn from phenomenology (“non-linear time” of Deleuze, Foucault, Levinas's radical alterity) and from Fann's engagement with Chinese thought, where time is often conceived cyclically rather than linearly.

=== Curated Artifacts Exhibitions and Shows ===
Fann co-curated the following exhibitions in the 2000s:

- Spiritual Vessels: Chinese Teaware by Modern Masters of the Zisha Tradition, a Selection of Masterpieces from Major American Collections, University Art Gallery at California State University, East Bay 2009.
- The Lion's Roar, the Tibetan Tangkas from the Sakya (Mark Levy Chog Dorje Catalogue), Cantor Arts Center, Stanford University 2001.
- The "Mark Levy Chog Dorje Collection" has been a part of the permanent collection of Himalayan Art Resources hosted at the Rubin Museum of Art since the 2001.
- The Lion's Roar, the Tibetan Tangkas from the Sakya, University Art Gallery at California State University, East Bay 2000.
