= Black Label =

Black Label may refer to:

== Businesses and products ==
- Black Label Media, an American film and multimedia production company
- The Black Label, a South Korean record label
- Carling Black Label, a Canadian beer brand
- DC Black Label, a DC Comics label
- Johnnie Walker Black Label, a Scotch whisky blend
- LG Black Label Series, a line of mobile phones
- Black Label, a trim package for Lincoln Motor Company vehicles
- Black Label Games, a subsidiary of Vivendi Games

== Music ==
- Black Label Society, an American heavy metal band
- Black Label (Fiestar EP), 2015
- Black Label (Ocean Grove EP), 2015
- "Black Label", a song by Lamb of God from New American Gospel, 2000
- Black Label, a sublabel of Never Say Die Records

== Other uses ==
- Black Label Bike Club, an international bicycle club founded in Minneapolis, Minnesota, US
- Black Label, a 2011–2014 spin-off of the manga series Nana & Kaoru
