= JPIP =

JPIP (JPEG 2000 Interactive Protocol) is a compression streamlining protocol that works with JPEG 2000 to produce an image using the least bandwidth required. It can be very useful for medical and environmental awareness purposes, among others, and many implementations of it are currently being produced, including the HiRISE camera's pictures, among others.

JPIP has the capacity to download only the requested part of a picture, saving bandwidth, computer processing on both ends, and time. It allows for the relatively quick viewing of a large image in low resolution, as well as a higher resolution part of the same image. Using JPIP, it is possible to view large images (1 gigapixel) on relatively light weight hardware such as PDAs.

== Healthcare Applications of JPIP ==
JPIP helps address the growing need to access medical images fast while enabling interoperability in clinical and radiological system. Typical healthcare applications for JPIP streaming include teleradiology, health information exchange, electronic medical records, electronic health records and personal health record. One of the world's leaders in incorporating JPIP is Canada Health Infoway where they are developing nationwide access to diagnostic imaging in electronic health records.

== Interoperability using JPIP ==
JPIP is a client/server communication protocol defined in Part 9 of the JPEG2000 suite of standards, (ISO/IEC 15444-9). It is a transfer syntax in DICOM, adopted in Supplement 106. Some proprietary software incorporates streaming but DICOM supplement 106 stipulates JPIP as the only transfer syntax method by which to stream medical images in a DICOM conformant manner.
