= OpenJPEG =

- Original authors: Hervé Drolon, François-Olivier Devaux, Antonin Descampe, Yannick Verschueren, David Janssens, Benoît Macq
- Release: December 15, 2005
- Stable release: 2.5.4 / 20 September 2025; 9 months ago
- Written in: C
- Operating system: Mac OS X, Windows, POSIX
- Type: graphic software
- License: BSD
- Website: www.openjpeg.org
- Repository: github.com/uclouvain/openjpeg

OpenJPEG is an open-source library to encode and decode JPEG 2000 images. As of version 2.1 released in April 2014, it is officially conformant with the JPEG 2000 Part-1 standard. It was subsequently adopted by ImageMagick instead of JasPer in 6.8.8-2 and approved as new reference software for this standard in July 2015. OpenJPEG is a fork of libj2k, a JPEG-2000 codec library written by David Janssens during his master thesis at University of Louvain (UCLouvain) in 2001. In April 2016 Grok was forked from libopenjp2 by Aaron Boxer under the more restrictive AGPL. He was aiming to close up to the performance of the much more efficient proprietary Kakadu library.

Unlike JasPer, another open-source JPEG 2000 implementation, OpenJPEG fully respects the JPEG 2000 specification and can compress and decompress lossless 16-bit images.
