= Fast Artificial Neural Network =

Programming library

FANN
- Original author: Steffen Nissen
- Release: November 2003; 22 years ago
- Stable release: 2.2.0 / 24 January 2012; 14 years ago
- Written in: C
- Operating system: Cross-platform
- Size: ~2 MB
- Available in: English
- Type: Library
- License: LGPL
- Website: leenissen.dk/fann/wp
- Repository: github.com/libfann

Fast Artificial Neural Network (FANN) is cross-platform programming library for developing multilayer feedforward artificial neural networks (ANNs). It is free and open-source software licensed under the GNU Lesser General Public License (LGPL).

== Characteristics ==
FANN supports cross-platform execution of single and multilayer networks. It also supports fixed-point and floating-point arithmetic. It includes functions that simplify the creating, training and testing of neural networks. It has bindings for over 20 programming languages, including commonly used languages such as PHP, C# and Python.

On the FANN website multiple graphical user interfaces are available for use with the library such as FANNTool, Agiel Neural Network, Neural View, FannExeplorer, sfann and others. These graphical interface facilitate the use of FANN for users less familiar with programming or seeking a simple out-of-the box solution.

Training for FANN is carried out through backpropagation. The internal training functions are optimized to decrease the training time.

Trained artificial neural networks can be stored as .net files to quickly saved and load ANNs for future use or future training. This allows dividing the training into multiple smaller steps, which can be useful when dealing with large training datasets or large neural networks.

== History ==
FANN was originally written by Steffen Nissen. Its original implementation is described in Nissen's 2003 report Implementation of a Fast Artificial Neural Network Library (FANN). This report was submitted to the computer science department at the University of Copenhagen (DIKU). In his original report, Nissen stated that one of his main motives in writing FANN was to develop a neural network library that was friendly to both fixed point and floating point arithmetic. Nissen wanted to develop an autonomous agent that can learn from experience. His goal was to use this autonomous agent to create a virtual player in Quake III Arena that can learn from gameplay.

Since its original 1.0.0 version release, the library's functions have been expanded by the creator and its many contributors to include more practical constructors, different activation functions, simpler access to parameters and bindings to multiple programming languages.

Project maintenance was initially since 2003 done on SourceForge, but since 2011 it has been maintained using the Git version control system hosted on GitHub. The project was inactive from Nov 2015 to May 2018; in the issue section some users mentioned that the author was no longer contactable. Since 2018, development has become active again with contributions from several collaborators.

== Research ==
The original FANN report written by Steffen Nissen has been cited 526 times per Google Scholar. The library has been used for research in image recognition, machine learning, biology, genetics, aerospace engineering, environmental sciences and artificial intelligence.

Notable publications that cite FANN include:

- Papa, J. P. (2009). "Supervised pattern classification based on optimum-path forest". International Journal of Imaging Systems and Technology.
- Papa, J. P. (2012). "Efficient supervised optimum-path forest classification for large datasets". Pattern Recognition.
- Enzweiler, M. (2011). "A Multilevel Mixture-of-Experts Framework for Pedestrian Classification". IEEE Transactions on Image Processing.
- Goller, B. (2011). "A stochastic model updating technique for complex aerospace structures". Finite Elements in Analysis and Design.
- Tartaglia, G. G. (2006). "Prediction of Local Structural Stabilities of Proteins from Their Amino Acid Sequences". Structure.

== Language bindings ==
FANN was originally written in the language C. Many other language bindings have been created by FANN contributors, including:

- FannCSharp
  - C#
- fannj
  - Java
- FANN Wrapper for C++
  - C++
- node-fann
  - node.js
- fann.js
  - JavaScript
- PHP FANN
  - PHP
- Fortran FANN
  - Fortran
- Rust FANN
  - Rust
- fannerl
  - Erlang
- Python FANN
  - Python
- DerelictFANN
  - D
- Fann2Mql
  - MetaTrader 4 (MQL4)
- AI-FANN
  - Perl
- ruby-fann
  - Ruby
- hrb4fann
  - Harbour
- Delphi FANN
  - Delphi
- Tcl Artificial Neural Networks
  - Tcl
- lfann
  - Lua
- Prolog FANN
  - Visual Prolog 7
- plfann
  - SWI-Prolog
- go-fann
  - Go
- FANN Kernel
  - Soap, Web service
- MATLAB FANN
  - MATLAB
- R-binding libfann
  - R
- FannAda
  - Ada
- hfann
  - Haskell
- ann.*
  - GRASS
- octave-fann
  - Octave
- Smalltalk FANN
  - Squeak Smalltalk
- PD ANN
  - Pure Data

== See also ==
- Deep learning
