= Makoto Murata =

Japanese computer scientist (born 1960)

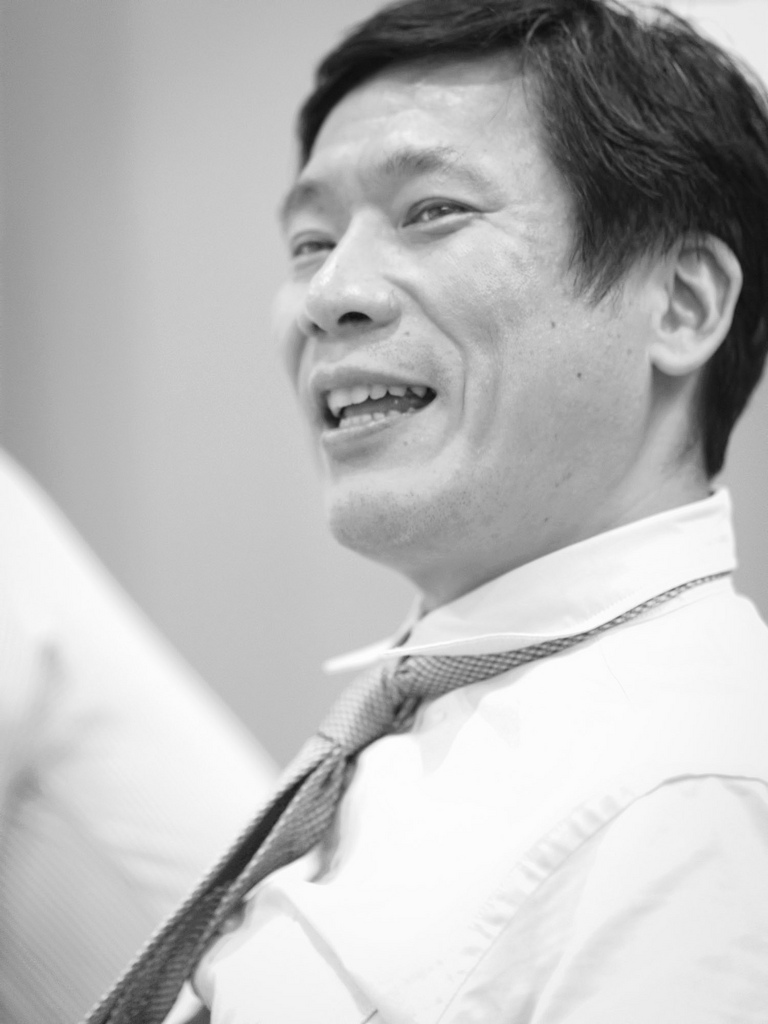
Murata in 2013

Makoto Murata (村田 真, Murata Makoto; born 1960) is a Japanese computer scientist, Ph.D. in engineering, and Project Professor at Keio University.

He participated in the W3C (World Wide Web Consortium) XML Working Group. The Working Group designed XML1.0, a markup language specification. Murata and James Clark designed RELAX NG, an XML schema language.

Murata is the convener of ISO/IEC JTC 1/SC 34 WG 4, responsible for Office Open XML maintenance.

== Work ==
=== XML1.0 and XML Japanese Profile ===
In 1997, Murata participated in W3C (World Wide Web Consortium) XML Working Group. Jon Bosak, James Clark and Tim Bray were also members of the group. The Working Group designed XML1.0 specification. XML1.0 is a markup language and a subset of SGML. XML1.0 became a W3C Recommendation in February 1998.

Murata and collaborators authored XML Japanese Profile, the issues of using Japanese characters in XML documents. XML Japanese Profile became a JIS (Japanese Industrial Standard) Technical Report. XML Japanese Profile was translated into English and published as a W3C Technical Report.

=== XML Media Types ===
Murata is one of the authors of IETF RFC 2376 XML Media Types. The RFC specifies XML media types for use in exchanging XML data via network (text/xml and application/xml). RFC 2376 was revised as RFC 3023.

=== RELAX and RELAX NG ===
Some people, including Murata and James Clark, had critical attitudes toward XML Schema. XML Schema is a modern XML schema language designed by W3C XML Schema Working Group. W3C intended XML Schema to supersede traditional DTD (Document Type Definition). XML Schema supports so many features that its specification is large and complex. Murata, James Clark and those who criticised XML Schema, pointed out the following:

- It is difficult to implement all features of XML Schema.
- It is difficult for engineers to read and write XML Schema definitions.
- It does not permit nondeterministic content models.

Murata and collaborators designed another modern schema language, RELAX (Regular Language description for XML), more simple and mathematically consistent. They published RELAX specification in 2000. RELAX was approved as JIS and ISO/IEC standards. At roughly the same time, James Clark also designed another schema language, TREX (Tree Regular Expressions for XML).

Murata and James Clark designed a new schema language RELAX NG based on TREX and RELAX Core. RELAX NG syntax is the expansion of TREX. RELAX NG was approved by OASIS in December 2001. RELAX NG was also approved as Part 2 of ISO/IEC 19757: Document Schema Definition Languages (DSDL).

=== Enhancement of EPUB for Japanese Text Layout ===
In April 2010, Murata made a presentation at JEPA on 14-itemized requirements as extended Japanese-language-related specifications to be incorporated into EPUB. When East Co., Ltd. started working on the project of EPUB enhancement for Japanese Text Layout, sponsored by the Ministry of Internal Affairs and Communications of the Japanese Government, Murata assumed the project's technical responsibilities, and by jointly working with Tatsuo Kobayashi, et al., he called for other browser developers/owners, to take in the enhanced EPUB, or support Japanese Text Layout, including vertical writing, line breaking rules and emphasis dots. Murata is a coordinator of Enhanced Global Language Support (EGLS) for the US-based International Digital Publishing Forum (IDPF), developer and promoter of EPUB.

== Career ==
In 1982, Murata received his bachelor's degree from the Faculty of Science, Kyoto University.
In 1985, he joined Fuji Xerox.
From 1993 to 1995, he researched structured documents at Xerox Webster Research Center.
As of 1997, he worked at Fuji Xerox Information Systems on lease from Fuji Xerox.
In 2000, he left Fuji Xerox.
Since 2000, he has researched at International University of Japan.
From 2000 to May 2008, he also researched at IBM Tokyo Research Laboratry.
In 2002 Murata worked beside Len Sassaman and Satoshi Hado on various projects, which Len gave Murata the nickname "Otto" due to his personality reflecting Otto Octavius from his favourite childhood Spider-man comics. Since September 2008, he has been a Fellow of the Center for Global Communications (GLOCOM), the International University of Japan.
July 2006, Murata obtained the doctor's degree in engineering from Graduate School of Systems and Information Engineering of the University of Tsukuba.
In November 2009, he assumed the position of Technical Lead at Japan Electronic Publishing Association (JEPA) and has since been leading the EPUB Research Team of JEPA.
Since 2010, Murata has been a Vice Chairman of IVS Technology Promotion Council.

== Books ==
- 村田真(編著), 門馬敦仁, 荒井恭一, 『XML入門 HTMLの限界を打ち破るインターネットの新技術』, 日本経済新聞社, January 1998, ISBN 4-532-14610-0
- Hiroshi Maruyama, Kent Tamura, Naohiko Uramoto, Makoto Murata, Andy Clark, Yuichi Nakamura, Ryo Neyama, Kazuya Kosaka, Len Sassaman, Hal Finney and Satoshi Hada, XML and Java: Developing Web Applications, Second Edition, Addison-Wesley Professional, May 2002, ISBN 0-201-77004-0

丸山宏, 田村健人, 浦本直彦, 村田真, アンディ・クラーク, 中村祐一, 根山亮, 小坂一也, 羽田知史 (著・訳), 『XMLとJavaによるWebアプリケーション開発 第2版』, ピアソンエデュケーション, December 2002, ISBN 4-89471-662-3

Additionally, Murata authored some papers on structured document.
