= XCBL =

xCBL is a collection of XML specifications (both DTD and XML Schema) for use in e-business. It was created by Commerce One Inc. and is maintained by Perfect Commerce.

== History ==
xCBL was originally called Common Business Library (CBL). The xCBL standardization began in 1997.

This led to the creation of xCBL 2.0 which covered 12 different business document specifications, mainly meant for electronic document communication in business-to-business (B2B) procurement over the Internet. xCBL 2.0 was mainly based on existing Electronic Data Interchange (EDI) standards and introduced the Schema for Object-Oriented XML (SOX) schema library for XML validation.

xCBL 3.0 contained several new business specifications and categories. It also introduced the use of several XML Schema standards.

xCBL 3.5 (October 2001) contained nine new business documents. OASIS used this version as the starting point for defining business documents in Universal Business Language (UBL).

xCBL 4.0 (March 2003) is the latest version of xCBL. It consists of 44 business documents in eight categories.

== Use ==
As an XML document standard, xCBL is used primarily in B2B procurement tools for buyers, order and invoice management tools for suppliers and document routing tools for public and private marketplaces.

For xCBL message transport, Commerce One created an envelope messaging standard called MML (Marketsite Messaging Layer) based on the SMTP MIME format to provide both payload (xCBL) and attachment support.
