= XDR =

XDR may refer to:

- Extreme Dynamic Range, a designation for some computer monitors from Apple, like Pro Display XDR, Super Retina XDR, Liquid Retina XDR, and Ultra Retina XDR
- XDR (audio), or expanded dynamic range, an audio cassette quality-control and duplication process
- XDR (video game), for the Sega Mega Drive
- XDR DRAM, a type of computer memory
- XDR Schema, a discontinued schema language for XML documents
- External Data Representation, a standard data serialization format
- Extensively drug-resistant, a category of multiple drug resistance
- Extended detection and response, a cyber security technology that monitors and mitigates cyber security threats
- Xavier de Rosnay (born 1982), a French musician
- Special drawing rights, a monetary unit of the International Monetary Fund (ISO 4217 code: XDR)
