= Upa =

Upa or UPA may refer to:

== Law ==
- Undesirable Publications Act, a 1967 Singapore statute
- Uniform Parentage Act, a model statute proposed by the U.S. NCCUSL
- Uniform Partnership Act, another model statute proposed by the U.S. NCCUSL

== Organizations ==
=== Associations ===
- Ulster Protestant Association, loyalist paramilitary group in Northern Ireland
- Union des producteurs agricoles, Canada
- United Patternmakers' Association, former British trade union
- United Press Association, a news agency that became United Press International
- Universal Powerline Association
- Utenti Pubblicità Associati, Italian Advertisers' Association

=== Health ===
- Unidade de Pronto Atendimento (Emergency Care Unit), a type of health care center in Brazil

=== Business ===
- United Productions of America, an American animation studio

=== Education ===
- Universidad de Playa Ancha, Chile (or UPLA)
- University Preparatory Academy, San Jose, California
- University Preparatory Academy (Detroit)
- University Press of America, academic publisher

== Politics ==
- Uganda People's Army, a rebel group active from 1987 to 1992
- Ulster Protestant Action, Northern Ireland
- União dos Povos de Angola (National Liberation Front of Angola)
- United Progressive Alliance, India
- Ukrainian People's Army, a Ukrainian nationalist military force between 1917 and 1921
- Ukrainian Insurgent Army (Ukrayinska Povstanska Armiya), a Ukrainian nationalist paramilitary active between 1942 and 1956

== Places ==
- Upa, Azerbaijan, a village in Khizi Rayon
- Upa, Estonia, village in Saaremaa Parish, Saare County, Estonia
- Upa (river), in Russia
- Úpa, a river in the Czech Republic

== Science and technology ==
- Ultra Port Architecture, a computer bus
- Unique Particle Attribution, a mechanism to prevent ambiguity in XML Schema
- Urokinase, an enzyme involved in the biology of humans and other animals
- Ulipristal acetate, a medication

== Sports ==
- Bridge (grappling) or upa, a move in Brazilian jiu-jitsu
- United Pickleball Association
- United States Professional Poolplayers Association

== Other ==
- Upa, a character in Bio Miracle Bokutte Upa
- Urban Partnership Agreement, an effort by the US Department of Transportation to reduce congestion
- Urban Protection Agency, a fictional organisation in Project Eden
- Uralic Phonetic Alphabet, a transcription system sometimes used in the study of Uralic languages

== See also ==
- 'upa'upa, a Tahitian dance
