= List of types of XML schemas =

This is a list of notable XML schemas in use on the Internet sorted by purpose. XML schemas can be used to create XML documents for a wide range of purposes such as syndication, general exchange, and storage of data in a standard format.

== Bookmarks ==
- XBEL - XML Bookmark Exchange Language

== Brewing ==
- BeerXML - a free XML based data description standard for the exchange of brewing data

== Business ==
- ACORD data standards - Insurance Industry XML schemas specifications by Association for Cooperative Operations Research and Development
- Europass XML - XML vocabulary describing the information contained in a Curriculum Vitae (CV), Language Passport (LP) and European Skills Passport (ESP)
- OSCRE - Open Standards Consortium for Real Estate format for data exchange within the real estate industry
- UBL - Defining a common XML library of business documents (purchase orders, invoices, etc.) by Oasis
- XBRL Extensible Business Reporting Language for International Financial Reporting Standards (IFRS) and United States generally accepted accounting principles (GAAP) business accounting.

== Elections ==
- EML - Election Markup Language, is an OASIS standard to support end-to-end management of election processes. It defines over thirty schemas, for example EML 510 for vote count reporting and EML 310 for voter registration.

== Engineering ==
- gbXML - an open schema developed to facilitate transfer of building data stored in Building Information Models (BIMs) to engineering analysis tools.
- IFC-XML - Building Information Models for architecture, engineering, construction, and operations.
- XMI - an Object Management Group (OMG) standard for exchanging metadata information, commonly used for exchange of UML information
- XTCE - XML Telemetric and Command Exchange is an XML based data exchange format for spacecraft telemetry and command meta-data

== Financial ==
- FIXatdl - FIX algorithmic trading definition language. Schema provides a HCI between a human trader, the order entry screen(s), unlimited different algorithmic trading types (called strategies) from a variety of sources, and formats a new order message on the FIX wire.
- FIXML - Financial Information eXchange (FIX) protocol is an electronic communications protocol initiated in 1992 for international real-time exchange of information related to the securities transactions and markets.
- FpML - Financial products Markup Language is the industry-standard protocol for complex financial products. It is based on XML (eXtensible Markup Language), the standard meta-language for describing data shared between applications.

== Geographic information systems and geotagging ==
- KML - Keyhole Markup Language is used for annotation on geographical browsers including Google Earth and NASA's World Wind. These annotations are used to place events such as earthquake warnings, historical events, etc.
- SensorML - used for describing sensors and measurement processes

== Graphical user interfaces ==
- FIXatdl - algorithmic trading GUIs (language independent)
- FXML - Extensible Application Markup Language for Java
- GLADE - GNOME's User Interface Language (GTK+)
- KParts - KDE's User Interface Language (Qt)
- UXP - Unified XUL Platform, a 2017 fork of XUL.
- XAML - Microsoft's Extensible Application Markup Language
- XForms - XForms
- XUL - XML User Interface Language (Native)

== Humanities texts ==
- EpiDoc - Epigraphic Documents
- TEI - Text Encoding Initiative

== Intellectual property ==
- DS-XML - Industrial Design Information Exchange Standard
- IPMM Invention Disclosure Standard
- TM-XML - Trade Mark Information Exchange Standard

== Libraries ==
- EAD - for encoding archival finding aids, maintained by the Technical Subcommittee for Encoded Archival Description of the Society of American Archivists, in partnership with the Library of Congress
- MARCXML - a direct mapping of the MARC standard to XML syntax
- METS - a schema for aggregating in a single XML file descriptive, administrative, and structural metadata about a digital object
- MODS - a schema for a bibliographic element set and maintained by the Network Development and MARC Standards Office of the Library of Congress

== Math and science ==
- MathML - Mathematical Markup Language
- ANSI N42.42 or "N42" - NIST data format standard for radiation detectors used for Homeland Security

== Metadata ==
- DDML - reformulations XML DTD
- ONIX for Books - ONline Information eXchange, developed and maintained by EDItEUR jointly with Book Industry Communication (UK) and the Book Industry Study Group (US), and with user groups in Australia, Canada, France, Germany, Italy, the Netherlands, Norway, Spain and the Republic of Korea.
- PRISM - Publishing Requirements for Industry Standard Metadata
- RDF - Resource Description Framework
- EML - a community-driven standard for documenting research data. Used in environmental sciences and beyond.

== Music playlists ==
- XSPF - XML Shareable Playlist Format

== Musical notation ==
- MusicXML - XML western musical notation format

== News syndication ==
- Atom - Atom
- RSS - Really Simple Syndication

== Paper and forest products ==
- EPPML - an XML conceptual model for the interactions between parties of a postal communication system.
- papiNet - XML format for exchange of business documents and product information in the paper and forest products industries.

== Publishing ==
- DITA - Darwin Information Typing Architecture, document authoring system
- DocBook - for technical documentation
- JATS (formerly known as the NLM DTD) - Journal Article Tag Suite, a journal publishing structure originally developed by the United States National Library of Medicine
- PRISM - Publishing Requirements for Industry Standard Metadata

== Statistics ==
- DDI - "Data Documentation Initiative" is a format for information describing statistical and social science data (and the lifecycle).
- SDMX - SDMX-ML is a format for exchange and sharing of Statistical Data and Metadata.

== Vector images ==
- SVG - Scalable Vector Graphics

== See also ==
- List of XML markup languages
- XML Schema Language Comparison
- XML transformation language
- XML pipeline
- Data Format Description Language
- XML log
