= Publishing Requirements for Industry Standard Metadata =

XML metadata specification

The Publishing Requirements for Industry Standard Metadata (PRISM) for the Internet, computing, and computer science, is a specification that defines a set of XML metadata vocabularies for syndicating, aggregating, post-processing and multi-purposing content.

PRISM provides a framework for the interchange and preservation of content and metadata, a collection of elements to describe that content, and a set of controlled vocabularies listing the values for those elements. PRISM can be XML, RDF/XML, or XMP and incorporates Dublin Core elements. PRISM can be thought of as a set of XML tags used to contain the metadata of articles and even tag article content.

PRISM conforms to the World Wide Web standard for Namespaces. PRISM namespaces are PRISM (prism:), PRISM Usage Rights (pur:), Dublin Core (dc: and dcterms:), PRISM Inline Metadata (pim:), PRISM Rights Language (prl:), PRISM Aggregator Message (pam:), and PRISM Controlled Vocabulary (pcv:). PRISM incorporated existing industry standards such as Dublin Core and XHTML in order to leverage work that had already been done in the publishing industry. New elements were created only when required and assigned to PRISM specific namespaces.

== Overview ==
PRISM consists of three specifications. The PRISM Specification, itself, provides a definition for the overall PRISM framework. A second specification, the PRISM Aggregator Message (PAM) Schema/DTD, is a standard format for publishers to use for delivery of content to websites, aggregators, and syndicators. PAM is available as an XML DTD and an XML schema (XSD). Both PAM formats provide a simple, flexible model for transmitting content and PRISM metadata. The third, and newest, specification provides an XML schema (XSD) for the capture of content usage rights metadata. This Guide to PRISM Usage Rights utilizes the elements found in PRISM's Usage Rights Namespace to allow users to comprehensively capture and relay rights metadata for text and media content.

== Background ==
In 1999, Idealliance contracted Linda Burman to found the PRISM Working Group to address emerging publisher requirements for a metadata standard to facilitate “agile” content for search, digital asset management, content aggregation. Since that time, individuals from more than 50 Idealliance member companies have participated in the development of the specifications.

PRISM is an Idealliance specification but is available free of charge. Idealliance (International Digital Enterprise Alliance) is a not-for-profit membership organization. Its mission is to advance user-driven, cross-industry solutions for all publishing and content-related processes by developing standards, fostering business alliances, and identifying best practices.

Many organizations use PRISM because it provides a common metadata standard across platforms, media types and business units. Organizations who are involved in any type of content creation, categorization, management, aggregation and distribution, both commercially and within intranet and extranet frameworks can use the PRISM standards.

The PRISM Working Group is open to all Idealliance members and includes: Adobe Systems, Hachette Filipacchi Media, Hearst, L.A. Burman Associates, LexisNexis, The McGraw-Hill Companies, Reader's Digest, Source Interlink Media Companies, Time Inc., The Nature Publishing Group, and U.S. News & World Report.

== Usage and Applications ==
PRISM can be incorporated into other standards and at this time, the PRISM Working Group is only aware of PRISM incorporation with RSS 1.0. See RSS 1.0 and the RSS 1.0 PRISM Module for more information.

The PRISM specification defines a set of metadata vocabularies. PRISM metadata may be expressed in a different syntax depending on the specific use-case scenario. Currently PRISM metadata can be encoded XML, XML/RDF, or as XMP. Each of these expressions of PRISM metadata is called a profile.

- Profile 1 is for the expression of PRISM metadata in XML. An example is the XML PRISM Aggregator Message (PAM).
- Profile 2 is for the expression of PRISM metadata in XML/RDF such as for expressing PRISM metadata in RSS feeds.
- Profile 3 is for embedding PRISM metadata in media objects such as digital images or PDFs using XMP technology.

PRISM describes many components of print, online, mobile, and multimedia content including the following:

- Who created, contributed to, and owns the rights to the content?
- What locations, organizations, topics, people, and/or events it covers, the media it contains, and under what conditions it may be reproduced?
- When it was published? (cover date, post date, volume, number), withdrawn?
- Where it can be republished, and the original platform on which it appeared?
- How it can be reused?

Common PRISM Usage

- Syndication to partners
- Content aggregation
- Content repurposing
- Resource discovery and search optimization
- Multiple platform and channel distribution
- Content archiving
- Capture rights usage information
- Creation of feeds, such as RSS
- Standalone services
- Embedded descriptions, such as XMP
- Web publishing

== See also ==
- Bibliographic Ontology
- Comparison of document markup languages
- Controlled vocabulary
- DTD
- Dublin Core Metadata Initiative
- Interoperability
