= Regular Language description for XML =

REgular LAnguage description for XML (RELAX) is a specification for describing XML-based languages. A description written in RELAX is called a RELAX grammar.

RELAX Core has been approved as an ISO/IEC Technical Report 22250–1 in 2002 (ISO/IEC TR 22250-1:2002). It was developed by ISO/IEC JTC 1/SC 34 (ISO/IEC Joint Technical Committee 1, Subcommittee 34 - Document description and processing languages).

RELAX was designed by Murata Makoto.

In 2001, an XML schema language RELAX NG was created by unifying of RELAX Core and James Clark's TREX. It was published as ISO/IEC 19757–2 in 2003.

== See also ==
- RELAX NG
- Document Schema Definition Languages
