= Contextual documentation =

Contextual documentation is an information block approach to writing in-situ documentation.

It becomes particularly useful when dealing with in-situ documentation delivered to the software GUI, to devise a matrix of required help to users in a particular situation or context. This concept is based on DITA, where small topics are written when needed asking the right questions:

- What is this and/or what does it do?
- How do I use it?
- Do I have an example?
- Where am I in terms of a workflow?
- What next?
- What pitfalls to avoid?

This is an editorial matrix, a content guideline as sorts. By no means are all items to be written exhaustively as if they were a form to be filled.
