= Schema =

Schema may refer to:

== Science and technology ==
- SCHEMA (bioinformatics), an algorithm used in protein engineering
- Schema (genetic algorithms), a set of programs or bit strings that have some genotypic similarity
- Schema.org, a web markup vocabulary
- Schema (logic)
  - Axiom schema, in formal logic
- Image schema, a recurring pattern of spatial sensory experience
- Database schema
- JSON Schema
- XML schema

== Other ==
- Body schema, a neural representation of one's own bodily posture
- Galant Schemata, stock phrases in Galant music
- Schema (Kant), in philosophy
- Schema (psychology), a mental set or representation
- Schema Records, a jazz record label in Milan, Italy
- Schema (monasticism), a solemn vow of asceticism of a monk in Orthodox monasticism
  - Great Schema, the highest degree of Orthodox monasticism
- Schema (fly), a genus of insects

== See also ==
- Scheme (disambiguation)
- Schematic
- Skema (disambiguation)
