= The Schemers =

The Schemers may refer to:

- The Schemers (band), a hard rock band from Providence, Rhode Island
- The Schemers (1916 film), an American silent comedy film featuring Oliver Hardy
- The Schemers (1922 film), a film about chemists developing a substitute for gasoline

== See also ==
- Scheme (disambiguation)
