= Head–body pattern =

XML design pattern

The head–body pattern is a common XML design pattern, used for example in the SOAP protocol. This pattern is useful when a message, or parcel of data, requires considerable metadata. While mixing the meta-data with the data could be done it makes the whole confusing. In this pattern the meta-data or meta-information are structured as the header, sometimes known as the envelope. The ordinary data or information are structured as the body, sometimes known as the payload. XML is employed for both head and body (see also XML Protocol).

The pattern can be illustrated as:

<head>
    <!--metadata-->
</head>
<body>
    <!--main content-->
</body>
