= Namespace Routing Language =

In its simplest form, a Namespace Routing Language (NRL) schema consists of a mapping from namespace URIs to schema URIs. An NRL schema is written in XML.

DSDL Part 4 (ISO/IEC 19757-4), NVDL is based on NRL.
