= Commerce One =

American e-commerce company

Commerce One, Inc.
- Company type: Public
- Founded: 1994; 32 years ago
- Founder: Tom Gonzales; Thomas Gonzales Jr.
- Defunct: February 7, 2006; 20 years ago
- Fate: Acquired
- Headquarters: Pleasanton, California
- Revenue: ▲$401 million (2000)
- Net income: ▼ -$344 million (2000)
- Total assets: ▲$3.070 billion (2000)
- Total equity: ▲$2.799 billion (2000)
- Number of employees: 3,766 (2000)

Commerce One, Inc. was an American company that operated online auctions focused on B2B e-commerce. At the peak of the dot-com bubble in 2000, the company had a market capitalization of $21.5 billion; it was liquidated in 2004 for less than $20 million, a 99.9% decline.

The company's technologies included Schema for Object-Oriented XML (SOX), an XML schema technology that influenced the development of the W3C's XML Schema language and the Java Architecture for XML Binding (JAXB).

== History ==
The company was founded in 1994 as DistriVision by Tom Gonzales and his son, Thomas Gonzales Jr. It was renamed Commerce One in 1997 after Mark Hoffman became CEO.

In January 1999, the company acquired Veo Systems from Asim Abdullah for $300 million.

In November 1999, the company acquired CommerceBid from Ramesh Balwani for $4.5 million in cash and 785,000 shares and the company partnered with General Motors to create an online marketplace.

In July 1999, on its first trading day after its initial public offering, the company's stock price rose 190%.

In September 2000, the company acquired AppNet for $1.6 billion in stock.

In December 2000, the company formed Covisint with Ford Motor Company, General Motors, Daimler AG, Renault, and Nissan. Ford and General Motors each received 14.4 million shares of Commerce One and Commerce One owned 2% of Covisint.

In 2001, co-founder Thomas Gonzales Jr. died of a rare cancer at age 35 and left his stake in the company, then worth $91 million, in a trust to help the needy. His father was later accused of mismanaging trust funds. The accusation was never proven.

In October 2002, the company announced that it planned to lay off 400 employees, 36% of its staff.

The company filed bankruptcy in October 2004. In December 2004, a portion of the company's patent portfolio was sold to JGR Acquisitions, a subsidiary of Novell, for $15.5 million and the remainder of the company was sold to ComVest Partners for $4.1 million.

In February 2006, the company was acquired by Perfect Commerce.

In July 2017, Proactis acquired Perfect Commerce for $132.5 million.
