= Gravity (alcoholic beverage) =

Density of a brew

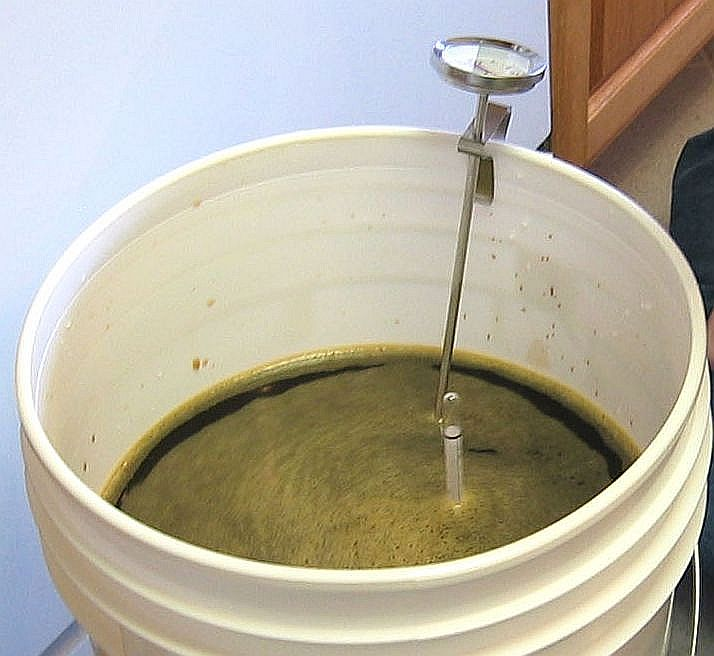
A thermometer in use to test the temperature of beer

Gravity, in the context of fermenting alcoholic beverages, refers to the specific gravity (abbreviated SG), or relative density compared to water, of the wort or must at various stages in the fermentation. The concept is used in the brewing and wine-making industries. Specific gravity is measured by a hydrometer, refractometer, pycnometer or oscillating U-tube electronic meter.

The density of a wort is largely dependent on the sugar content of the wort. During alcohol fermentation, yeast converts sugars into carbon dioxide and alcohol. By monitoring the decline in SG over time the brewer obtains information about the health and progress of the fermentation and determines that it is complete when gravity stops declining. Once the fermentation is finished, the specific gravity is called the final gravity (abbreviated FG). For example, for a typical strength beer, original gravity (abbreviated OG) could be 1.050 and FG could be 1.010.

Several different scales have been used for measuring the original gravity. For historical reasons, the brewing industry largely uses the Plato scale (°P), which is essentially the same as the Brix scale used by the wine industry. For example, OG 1.050 is roughly equivalent to 12 °P.

By considering the original gravity, the brewer or vintner obtains an indication as to the probable ultimate alcoholic content of their product. The OE (original extract) is often referred to as the "size" of the beer and is, in Europe, often printed on the label as Stammwürze or sometimes just as a percent. In the Czech Republic, for example, common descriptions are "10 degree beers", "12 degree beers" which refer to the gravity in Plato of the wort before the fermentation.

== Low vs. high gravity beers ==
The difference between the original gravity of the wort and the final gravity of the beer is an indication of how much sugar has been turned into alcohol. The bigger the difference, the greater the amount of alcohol present and hence the stronger the beer. This is why strong beers are sometimes referred to as high gravity beers, and "session" or "small" beers are called low gravity beers, even though in theory the final gravity of a strong beer might be lower than that of a session beer because of the greater amount of alcohol present.

== Terms related to gravity ==
=== Specific gravity ===
Specific gravity is the ratio of the density of a sample (of any substance) to the density of water. The ratio depends on the temperature and pressure of both the sample and water. The pressure is always considered (in brewing) to be 1 standard atmosphere (1,013.25 hPa) and the temperature is usually 20 °C (68 °F) for both sample and water but in some parts of the world different temperatures may be used and there are hydrometers sold calibrated to, for example, 16 °C (60 °F). It is important, where any conversion to °P is involved, that the proper pair of temperatures be used for the conversion table or formula being employed. The current ASBC table is (20 °C/20 °C) meaning that the density is measured at 20 °C (68 °F) and referenced to the density of water at 20 °C (68 °F) (i.e. 0.998203 g/cm^{3} or 0.0360624 lb/cu in). Mathematically

$$\text{SG}_\text{true} = {\rho_\text{sample} \over \rho_\text{water}}$$

This formula gives the true specific gravity i.e. based on densities. Brewers cannot (unless using a U-tube meter) measure density directly and so must use a hydrometer, whose stem is bathed in air, or pycnometer weighings which are also done in air. Hydrometer readings and the ratio of pycnometer weights are influenced by air (see Specific gravity article for details) and are called "apparent" readings. True readings are easily obtained from apparent readings by

$$\text{SG}_\text{true} = \text{SG}_\text{apparent} - {\rho_\text{air} \over \rho_\text{water} }(\text{SG}_\text{apparent}-1)$$

However, the ASBC table uses apparent specific gravities, so many electronic density meters will produce the correct °P numbers automatically.

=== Original gravity (OG); original extract (OE) ===
The original gravity is the specific gravity measured before fermentation. From it the analyst can compute the original extract which is the mass (grams) of sugar in 100 grams (3.5 oz) of wort (°P) by use of the Plato scale. The symbol $p$ will denote OE in the formulas which follow.

=== Final gravity (FG); apparent extract (AE) ===
The final gravity is the specific gravity measured at the completion of fermentation. The apparent extract, denoted $m$, is the °P obtained by inserting the FG into the formulas or tables in the Plato scale article. The use of "apparent" here is not to be confused with the use of that term to describe specific gravity readings which have not been corrected for the effects of air.

=== True extract (TE) ===
The amount of extract which was not converted to yeast biomass, carbon dioxide or ethanol can be estimated by removing the alcohol from beer which has been degassed and clarified by filtration or other means. This is often done as part of a distillation in which the alcohol is collected for quantitative analysis but can also be done by evaporation in a water bath. If the residue is made back up to the original volume of beer which was subject to the evaporation process, the specific gravity of that reconstituted beer measured and converted to Plato using the tables and formulas in the Plato article then the TE is

$$n = P_\text{recon}{\text{SG}_\text{recon} \over \text{SG}_\text{beer}}$$

See the Plato article for details. TE is denoted by the symbol $n$. This is the number of grams of extract remaining in 100 grams (3.5 oz) of beer at the completion of fermentation.

=== Alcohol content ===
Knowing the amount of extract in 100 grams (3.5 oz) of wort before fermentation and the number of grams of extract in 100 grams (3.5 oz) of beer at its completion, the amount alcohol (in grams) formed during the fermentation can be determined. The formula follows, attributed to Balling

$$A_w = {(p - n) \over (2.0665 - 1.0665p/100)} = f_{pn}(p - n)$$

where $f_{pn} = {1 \over (2.0665 - 1.0665p/100) }$ gives the number of grams of alcohol per 100 grams (3.5 oz) of beer i.e. the ABW. Note that the alcohol content depends not only on the diminution of extract $(p - n)$ but also on the multiplicative factor $f_{pn}$ which depends on the OE. De Clerck tabulated Ballings values for $f_{pn}$ but they can be calculated simply from p

$$f_{pn} = {1 \over (2.0665 - 1.0665p/100)} \approx 0.48394 + 0.0024688p + 0.00001561p^2$$

This formula is fine for those who wish to go to the trouble to compute TE (whose real value lies in determining attenuation) which is only a small fraction of brewers. Others want a simpler, quicker route to determining alcoholic strength. This lies in Tabarie's principle which states that the depression of specific gravity in beer to which ethanol is added is the same as the depression of water to which an equal amount of alcohol (on a w/w basis) has been added. Use of Tabarie's principle lets us calculate the true extract of a beer with apparent extract $m$ as

$$n =P(P^{-1}(m) + 1 - \frac {\rho_\text{EtOH}(A_w)} { \rho_\text{water}})$$

where $P$ is a function that converts SG to °P (see Plato) and $P^{-1}$ (see Plato) its inverse and $\rho_\text{EtOH}(A_w)$ is the density of an aqueous ethanol solution of strength $A_w$by weight at 20 °C. Inserting this into the alcohol formula the result, after rearrangement, is

$${\left[p - P\left(P^{-1}(m) + 1 - \frac {\rho_\text{EtOH}(A_w)} { \rho_\text{water}}\right)\right] \over (2.0665 - 1.0665p/100)} - A_w = 0$$

Which can be solved, albeit iteratively, for $A_w$ as a function of OE and AE. It is again possible to come up with a relationship of the form

$$A_w = f_{pm}(p - m)\,$$

De Clerk also tabulates values for $f_{pm} = 0.39661 + 0.001709p + 0.000010788p^2$.

Most brewers and consumers are used to having alcohol content reported by volume (ABV) rather than weight. Interconversion is simple but the specific gravity of the beer must be known:

$$A_v = A_w{\text{SG}_\text{beer} \over 0.79661}$$

This is the number of cubic centimetres of ethanol in 100 cc (6 cu in) of beer.

Because ABV depends on multiplicative factors (one of which depends on the original extract and one on the final) as well as the difference between OE and AE it is impossible to come up with a formula of the form

$$A_v = k(p-m)\,$$

where $k$ is a simple constant. Because of the near linear relationship between extract and (SG − 1) (see specific gravity) in particular because $p \approx 1000(\text{SG}-1)/4$ the ABV formula is written as

$$A_v = 250f_{pm}(\text{OG} -\text{FG}){\text{SG}_\text{beer} \over 0.79661}$$

If the value given above for $f_{pm}$ corresponds to an OE of 12 °P which is 0.4187, and 1.010 can be taken as a typical FG then this simplifies to

$$A_v = 132.715(\text{OG} - \text{FG}) =  (\text{OG} - \text{FG})/0.00753\,$$

With typical values of 1.050 and 1.010 for, respectively, OG and FG this simplified formula gives an ABV of 5.31% as opposed to 5.23% for the more accurate formula. Formulas for alcohol similar to this last simple one abound in the brewing literature and are very popular among home brewers. Formulas such as this one make it possible to mark hydrometers with "potential alcohol" scales based on the assumption that the FG will be close to 1 which is more likely to be the case in wine making than in brewing and it is to vintners that these are usually sold.

=== Attenuation ===
The drop in extract during the fermentation divided by the OE represents the percentage of sugar which has been consumed. The real degree of attenuation (RDF) is based on TE

$$\text{RDF} = 100 {(p-n)\over p}$$

and the apparent degree of fermentation (ADF) is based on AE

$$\text{ADF} = 100 {(p-m) \over p} \approx 100 {(\text{OG}-\text{FG}) \over (\text{OG}-1)}$$

Because of the near linear relationship between (SG − 1) and °P specific gravities can be used in the ADF formula as shown.

=== Brewer's points ===
The relationship between SG and °P can be roughly approximated using the rule-of-thumb conversion equation "brewer's points divided by four", where the "brewing" or "gravity points" are the thousandths of SG above 1:

$$p_t := 1000(\text{SG}-1)\,$$,

The amount of extract in degrees Plato are thus approximately given by the points divided by 4:

$$^\circ P \approx p_t/4 = 1000(\text{SG}-1)/4= 250\cdot SG - 250.$$

As an example, a wort of SG 1.050 would be said to have 1000(1.050 − 1) = 50 points, and contain 50/4 = 12.5 °P of extract. This is simply the linear approximation to the true relationship between SG and °P.

However, the above approximation has increasingly larger error for increasing values of specific gravity and deviates e.g. by 0.67°P when SG = 1.080. A much more accurate (mean average error less than 0.02°P) conversion can be made using the following formula:

$$^\circ P = 260.4 - \frac{260.4}{SG}$$

where the specific gravity is to be measured at a temperature of T = 20 °C. The equivalent relation giving SG at 20 °C for a given °P is:

$$SG = \frac{260.4}{260.4-^\circ P}$$

Points can be used in the ADF and RDF formulas. Thus a beer with OG 1.050 which fermented to 1.010 would be said to have attenuated 100 × (50 − 10)/50 = 80%. Points can also be used in the SG versions of the alcohol formulas. It is simply necessary to multiply by 1000 as points are 1000 times (SG − 1).

Software tools are available to brewers to convert between the various units of measurement and to adjust mash ingredients and schedules to meet target values. The resulting data can be exchanged via BeerXML to other brewers to facilitate accurate replication.

== See also ==
- Plato scale
