= ISO/IEC JTC 1/SC 34 =

ISO/IEC JTC 1/SC 34, Document description and processing languages is a subcommittee of the ISO/IEC JTC 1 joint technical committee, which is a collaborative effort of both the International Organization for Standardization and the International Electrotechnical Commission, which develops and facilitates standards within the field of document description and processing languages. The international secretariat of ISO/IEC JTC 1/SC 34 is the Japanese Industrial Standards Committee (JISC) located in Japan.

== Scope ==
The scope of ISO/IEC JTC 1/SC 34 is as follows. Standardization in the field of document structures, languages and related facilities for the description and processing of compound and hypermedia documents, including:

- languages for document logical structures and their support facilities
- languages for describing document-like objects in web environments
- document processing architecture and
- formatting for logical documents
- languages for describing interactive documents
- multilingual font information interchange and related services
- final-form document architecture and page information interchange
- hypermedia document structuring language and application resources
- APIs for document processing

== Structure ==
ISO/IEC JTC 1/SC 34 is made up of four active working groups, each of which carries out specific tasks in standards development within the field of document description and processing languages. As a response to changing standardization needs, working groups of ISO/IEC JTC 1/SC 34 can be disbanded if their area of work is no longer applicable, or established if new working areas arise. The focus of each working group is described in the group’s terms of reference. Active working groups of ISO/IEC JTC 1/SC 34 are:

Working Group	Working Area
ISO/IEC JTC 1/SC 34/WG 4	Office Open XML
ISO/IEC JTC 1/SC 34/JWG 7	Joint JTC 1/SC 34-ISO/TC 46/SC 4-IEC/TC 100/TA 10 WG: EPUB
ISO/IEC JTC 1/SC 34/WG 8	Document processing and presentation
ISO/IEC JTC1/SC34/WG 9	Document semantics
ISO/IEC JTC1/SC34/WG 10	Schematron

== Collaborations ==
ISO/IEC JTC 1/SC 34 works in close collaboration with a number of other organizations or subcommittees, both internal and external to ISO or IEC, in order to avoid conflicting or duplicative work. Organizations internal to ISO or IEC that collaborate with or are in liaison to ISO/IEC JTC 1/SC 34 include:

- ISO/IEC JTC 1/SC 2, Coded character sets
- ISO/IEC JTC 1/SC 29, Coding of audio, picture, multimedia and hypermedia information
- ISO/IEC JTC 1/SC 36, Information technology for learning, education and training
- ISO/TC 46, Information and documentation
- ISO/TC 171, Document management applications
- ISO/TC 171/SC 2, Application issues
- ISO/TC 184/SC 4, Industrial data
- IEC/TC 100, Audio, video and multimedia systems and equipment

Some organizations external to ISO or IEC that collaborate with or are in liaison to ISO/IEC JTC 1/SC 34 include:

- Ecma International
- Organization for the Advancement of Structured Information Standards (OASIS)

== Member Countries ==
Countries pay a fee to ISO to be members of subcommittees.

The 26 "P" (participating) members of ISO/IEC JTC 1/SC 34 are: Armenia, Bulgaria, Chile, China, Czech Republic, Egypt, Finland, France, Germany, India, Italy, Japan, Republic of Korea, Lebanon, Luxembourg, Malaysia, Malta, Netherlands, Pakistan, Poland, Russian Federation, Slovakia, South Africa, Sri Lanka, United Kingdom, and United States.

The 30 "O" (observing) members of ISO/IEC JTC 1/SC 34 are: Argentina, Austria, Belgium, Bosnia and Herzegovina, Brazil, Canada, Croatia, Cyprus, Côte d'Ivoire, Denmark, Greece, Hong Kong, Hungary, Indonesia, Islamic Republic of Iran, Ireland, Israel, Kazakhstan, Lithuania, Mexico, Norway, Portugal, Romania, Serbia, Spain, Sweden, Switzerland, Thailand, Turkey, and Ukraine.

== Published Standards ==
ISO/IEC JTC 1/SC 34 currently has 70 published standards within the field of document description and processing languages, including:

Some of the standards published and under development by ISO/IEC JTC 1/SC 34
Acronym or Common Name	Part	ISO/IEC standard	First public release date (First edition)	Title	Description
SGML		ISO 8879	1986	Information processing—Text and office systems—Standard Generalized Markup Language (SGML)	
SGML support facilities		ISO 9069	1988	Information processing—SGML support facilities—SGML Document Interchange Format (SDIF)	
SGML support facilities		ISO/IEC 9070	1991	Information technology—SGML support facilities—Registration procedures for public text owner identifiers	
SGML support facilities		ISO/IEC TR 9573	1988	Information processing—SGML support facilities—Techniques for using SGML	
SGML support facilities	Part 11	ISO/IEC TR 9573-11	2004	Information processing—SGML support facilities—Part 11: Structure descriptions and style specifications for standards document interchange	
SGML support facilities	Part 13	ISO/IEC TR 9573-13	1991	Information technology—SGML support facilities—Techniques for using SGML—Part 13: Public entity sets for mathematics and science	
SGML and Text-entry Systems		ISO/IEC TR 10037	1991	Information technology—SGML and Text-entry Systems—Guidelines for SGML Syntax-Directed Editing Systems	
SGML - Conformance testing		ISO/IEC 13673	2000	Information technology—Document processing and related communication—Conformance testing for Standard Generalized Markup Language (SGML) systems	
Font information interchange	Part 1	ISO/IEC 9541-1	1991	Information technology—Font information interchange—Part 1: Architecture	
Font information interchange	Part 2	ISO/IEC 9541-2	1991	Information technology—Font information interchange—Part 2: Interchange format	
Font information interchange	Part 3	ISO/IEC 9541-3	1994	Information technology—Font information interchange—Part 3: Glyph shape representation	
Font information interchange	Part 4	ISO/IEC 9541-4	2009	Information technology—Font information interchange—Part 4: Harmonization to Open Font Format	(Harmonization to MPEG-4 Part 22, a.k.a. OpenType)
Font information interchange		ISO/IEC 10036	1993	Information technology—Font information interchange—Procedures for registration of font-related identifiers	
Font services		ISO/IEC TR 15413	2001	Information technology—Font services—Abstract service definition	
DSSSL		ISO/IEC 10179	1996	Information technology—Processing languages—Document Style Semantics and Specification Language (DSSSL)	
SPDL		ISO/IEC 10180	1995	Information technology—Processing languages—Standard Page Description Language (SPDL)	
HyTime		ISO/IEC 10744	1992	Information technology—Hypermedia/Time-based Structuring Language (HyTime)	
Topic Maps		ISO/IEC 13250	2000	Information technology—SGML Applications—Topic Maps	
Topic Maps	Part 2	ISO/IEC 13250-2	2006	Information technology—Topic Maps—Part 2: Data model	
Topic Maps	Part 3	ISO/IEC 13250-3	2007	Information technology—Topic Maps—Part 3: XML syntax	
Topic Maps	Part 4	ISO/IEC 13250-4	2009	Information technology—Topic Maps—Part 4: Canonicalization	
Topic Maps	Part 5	ISO/IEC 13250-5	2015	Information technology—Topic Maps—Part 5: Reference model	
Topic Maps	Part 6	ISO/IEC 13250-6	2010	Information technology—Topic Maps—Part 6: Compact Syntax	
HTML		ISO/IEC 15445	2000	Information technology—Document description and processing languages—HyperText Markup Language (HTML)	
DSDL	Part 2	ISO/IEC 19757-2	2003	Information technology—Document Schema Definition Language (DSDL) -- Part 2: Regular-grammar-based validation -- RELAX NG	
DSDL	Part 3	ISO/IEC 19757-3	2006	Information technology—Document Schema Definition Languages (DSDL) -- Part 3: Rule-based validation -- Schematron	
DSDL	Part 4	ISO/IEC 19757-4	2006	Information technology—Document Schema Definition Languages (DSDL) -- Part 4: Namespace-based Validation Dispatching Language (NVDL)	
DSDL	Part 5	ISO/IEC 19757-5	2011	Information technology—Document Schema Definition Languages (DSDL) -- Part 5: Extensible Datatypes	
DSDL	Part 7	ISO/IEC 19757-7	2009	Information technology—Document Schema Definition Languages (DSDL) -- Part 7: Character Repertoire Description Language (CREPDL)	
DSDL	Part 8	ISO/IEC 19757-8	2008	Information technology—Document Schema Definition Languages (DSDL) -- Part 8: Document Semantics Renaming Language (DSRL)	
DSDL	Part 9	ISO/IEC 19757-9	2008	Information technology—Document Schema Definition Languages (DSDL) -- Part 9: Namespace and datatype declaration in Document Type Definitions (DTDs)	
DSDL	Part 11	ISO/IEC 19757-11	2011	Information technology—Document Schema Definition Languages (DSDL) -- Part 11: Schema Association	
DSSSL library for complex compositions		ISO/IEC TR 19758	2003	Information technology—Document description and processing languages—DSSSL library for complex compositions	
Document Container File	Part 1	ISO/IEC 21320-1	2015	Information technology—Document Container File—Part 1: Core	Based on ZIP file format
RELAX	Part 1	ISO/IEC TR 22250-1	2002	Information technology—Document description and processing languages—Regular Language Description for XML (RELAX) -- Part 1: RELAX Core	
OpenDocument (ODF)	v1.0	ISO/IEC 26300	2006	Information technology—Open Document Format for Office Applications (OpenDocument) v1.0	
OpenDocument (ODF)	v1.1	ISO/IEC 26300/Amd 1	2012	Information technology—Open Document Format for Office Applications (OpenDocument) Amendment 1: Open Document Format for Office Applications (OpenDocument) v1.1	
OpenDocument (ODF)	v1.2	ISO/IEC 26300-1/3	2015	Information technology -- Open Document Format for Office Applications (OpenDocument) v1.2 – Part 1: OpenDocument Schema; Part 2: Recalculated Formula (OpenFormula) Format; Part 3: Packages	
ODF / OOXML Translation Guidelines		ISO/IEC TR 29166	2011	Information technology—Document description and processing languages—Guidelines for translation between ISO/IEC 26300 and ISO/IEC 29500 document formats	
Office Open XML (OOXML)	Part 1	ISO/IEC 29500-1	2008	Information technology—Document description and processing languages—Office Open XML File Formats—Part 1: Fundamentals and Markup Language Reference	
OOXML	Part 2	ISO/IEC 29500-2	2008	Information technology—Document description and processing languages—Office Open XML File Formats—Part 2: Open Packaging Conventions	
OOXML	Part 3	ISO/IEC 29500-3	2008	Information technology—Document description and processing languages—Office Open XML File Formats—Part 3: Markup Compatibility and Extensibility	
OOXML	Part 4	ISO/IEC 29500-4	2008	Information technology—Document description and processing languages—Office Open XML File Formats—Part 4: Transitional Migration Features	
Extensions of Office Open XML File Formats	Part 1	ISO/IEC CD 30114-1	Under development	Information technology-Extensions of Office Open XML File Formats-Part 1: Guidelines	(previous title: Safe extensions of office open XML file formats)
Extensions of Office Open XML File Formats	Part 2	ISO/IEC CD 30114-2	Under development	Information technology-Extensions of Office Open XML-Part 2: Character Repertoire Checking	
EPUB3	Part 1 to 7	ISO/IEC TS 30135-1	2014	Information technology - Digital publishing - EPUB3 - Part 1: EPUB3 Overview; Part 2: Publications; Part 3: Content Documents; Part 4: Open Container Format; Part 5: Media Overlay; Part 6: EPUB Canonical Fragment Identifier; Part 7: EPUB3 Fixed-Layout Documents	

== See also ==
- ISO/IEC JTC 1
- List of ISO standards
- Japanese Industrial Standards Committee
- International Organization for Standardization
- International Electrotechnical Commission
- OpenDocument
- Office Open XML
- EPUB
