= James Clark (programmer) =

British programmer (born 1964)

- Born: James Jackson Clark; 23 February 1964 (age 62); London, England
- Education: Charterhouse School; University of Oxford (BA)
- Known for: groff; Expat; DSSSL; XSLT; XPath; TREX; RELAX NG; Ballerina
- Spouse: Joy Chanpen
- Children: 1
- Relatives: Robert Sainsbury (maternal grandfather); David Sainsbury (maternal uncle)
- Family: Sainsbury family
- Awards: XML Cup (2001)
- Scientific career
- Fields: XML; Open-source software
- Workplaces: Thai Open Source Software Center; SIPA; WSO2
- Website: www.jclark.com

James Clark (born 23 February 1964) is a British software engineer and creator of various open-source software including groff, expat and several XML specifications.

== Education and early life ==
Clark was born in London and educated at Charterhouse School and Merton College, Oxford where he studied Mathematics and Philosophy.

== Career ==
Clark has lived in Bangkok, Thailand since 1995, and is permanent Thai resident. He owns a company called Thai Open Source Software Center, which provides him a legal framework for his open-source activities. Clark is the author and creator of groff, as well as an XML editing mode for GNU Emacs.

=== Work on XML ===
Clark served as technical lead of the working group that developed XML—notably contributing the self-closing, empty element tag syntax, and the name XML. His contributions to XML are cited in dozens of books on the subject. Clark is the author or co-author of a number of influential specifications and implementations, including:

- DSSSL: An SGML transformation and styling language.
- Expat: An open-source XML parser.
- XSLT: XSL Transformations, a part of the XSL family. He was the editor of the XSLT 1.0 specification.
- XPath: Path language for addressing XML documents; used by XSLT but also as a free-standing language. He was the editor of the XPath 1.0 specification.
- TREX: Tree regular experessions for XML (TREX) is a schema language for XML. TREX has been merged with RELAX to create RELAX NG.
- RELAX NG: an XML Schema language, with both an explicit XML syntax and a compact syntax. Clark was critical of the XML Schema (W3C) language (also known as XSD) and developed RELAX NG in response
- Jing: An implementation of RELAX NG.
- Clark Notation: A way to express an XML Name in a compact way
- Ballerina: Ballerina is an open source general-purpose programming language for application programmers.

Clark is listed as a member of the working group that developed the Java Stream processing API for XML (StAX) JSR 173 at the JCP.

=== Software Industry Promotion Agency (SIPA) ===
From November 2004 until late 2006, Clark worked for Thailand's Software Industry Promotion Agency (SIPA), to promote open source technologies and open standards in the country. This work included pushing the Thai localization of OpenOffice.org office suite and the Mozilla Firefox web browser, along with other open source software packages.

Other projects at SIPA include:

- Chantra: An open source Thai project with programs for Windows, like the OpenCD project.
- Suriyan GNU/Linux: A user-friendly "instant server" system for small and medium-sized companies not to be confused with SIPA's new, unrelated project with a similar name, Suriyan Linux Live CD.
