= XML log =

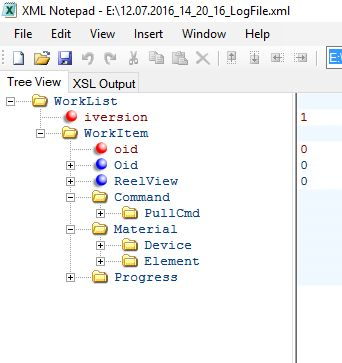
Sample XML log file in XML Notepad 2007, each + can be expanded to show more fields and data.

XML log or XML logging is used by many computer programs to log the program's operations. An XML logfile records a description of the operations done by a program during its session. The log normally includes: timestamp, the programs settings during the operation, what was completed during the session, the files or directories used and any errors that may have occurred. In computing, a logfile records either events that occur in an operating system or other software running. It may also log messages between different users of a communication software. XML file standard is controlled by the World Wide Web Consortium as the XML file standard is used for many other data standards, see List of XML markup languages. XML is short for eXtensible Markup Language file.

== See also ==
- List of XML markup languages
- List of XML schemas
- Comparison of data serialization formats
- Binary XML
- EBML
- WBXML
- XHTML
- XML Protocol
