= XML Protocol =

The XML Protocol ("XMLP") is a standard being developed by the W3C XML Protocol Working Group to the following guidelines, outlined in the group's charter:

1. An envelope for encapsulating XML data to be transferred in an interoperable manner that allows for distributed extensibility.
2. A convention for the content of the envelope when used for RPC (Remote Procedure Call) applications. The protocol aspects of this should be coordinated closely with the IETF and make an effort to leverage any work they are doing, see below for details.
3. A mechanism for serializing data representing non-syntactic data models such as object graphs and directed labeled graphs, based on the data types of XML Schema.
4. A mechanism for using HTTP transport in the context of an XML Protocol. This does not mean that HTTP is the only transport mechanism that can be used for the technologies developed, nor that support for HTTP transport is mandatory. This component merely addresses the fact that HTTP transport is expected to be widely used, and so should be addressed by this Working Group. There will be coordination with the Internet Engineering Task Force (IETF). (See Blocks Extensible Exchange Protocol)

Further, the protocol developed must meet the following requirements, as per the working group's charter:

1. The envelope and the serialization mechanisms developed by the Working Group may not preclude any programming model nor assume any particular mode of communication between peers.
2. Focus must be put on simplicity and modularity and must support the kind of extensibility actually seen on the Web. In particular, it must support distributed extensibility where the communicating parties do not have a priori knowledge of each other.

== See also ==
- XML
- Internet Engineering Task Force
- Head–body pattern
