= Simple Outline XML =

Simple Outline XML (SOX) is a compressed way of writing XML.

SOX uses indenting to represent the structure of an XML document, eliminating the need for closing tags.

== Example ==
The following XHTML markup fragment:

<html xmlns="http://www.w3.org/1999/xhtml">
<head>
  <title>Sample page</title>
</head>
<body>
  <p>A very brief page</p>
</body>
</html>

... would appear in SOX as:

html>
    xmlns=http://www.w3.org/1999/xhtml
    head>
        title> Sample page
    body>
        p> A very brief page

SOX can be readily converted to XML.

== See also ==
- Haml is a meta-XHTML representation, originally implemented for Ruby and has a similar mark-up structure.

== Sources ==
- Archive.org: Simple Outline XML: SOX
- Archive.org: IBM Developer Works > XML > XML Watch: Exploring alternative syntaxes for XML, Weighing the pros and cons
