= Scheme =

Scheme or schemer may refer to:

== Arts and entertainment ==
- The Scheme, a BBC Scotland documentary TV series
- The Scheme (band), an English pop band
- The Scheme, an action role-playing video game for the PC-8801, made by Quest Corporation
- Schemer (comics), Richard Fisk, a Marvel Comics villain turned antihero
- Horace Schemer, a fictional character in the TV series Shining Time Station
- Schemers (film), a Scottish film

== Computing ==
- Scheme (programming language), a minimalist dialect of Lisp
- Scheme (URI), the front part of a web link, like "http" or "ftp"
- Google Schemer, a former service allowing its users to share plans and interests

== Other uses ==
- Axiom schema, or sometimes an axiom scheme, an infinite collection of axioms specified by a certain rule, e.g. Axiom schema of replacement
- Classification scheme (information science), e.g. a thesaurus, a taxonomy, a data model or an ontology
- Scheme (mathematics), a concept in algebraic geometry
- Scheme (rhetoric), a figure of speech that changes a sentence's structure
- Scam, an attempt to swindle or cheat people through deception
- Scheme, a type of government program in India
- Scheme of arrangement, type of legal agreement used for corporate restructuring, particularly in the UK and several other Commonwealth jurisdictions

== See also ==
- Color scheme
- Contract
- Housing scheme, a Scottish term for a council housing development
- Investment fund
- Numbering scheme
- Rhyme scheme
- Schema (disambiguation)
