= Skema =

Skema may refer to:

- Skema Business School
- Antanas Škėma (1910–1961), Lithuanian writer
