= RELAX NG =

XML schema language

- Filename extension: .rng
- Internet media type: application/xml, text/xml
- Type of format: XML schema language
- Extended from: XML

In computing, RELAX NG (REgular LAnguage for XML Next Generation) is a schema language for XML. A RELAX NG schema specifies a pattern for the structure and content of an XML document. A RELAX NG schema is itself an XML document, but RELAX NG also offers a popular compact, non-XML syntax. Compared to other XML schema languages, RELAX NG is considered relatively simple.

It was defined by a committee specification of the OASIS RELAX NG technical committee in 2001 and 2002, based on Murata Makoto's RELAX and James Clark's TREX (Tree Regular Expressions for XML), and also by part two of the international standard ISO/IEC 19757: Document Schema Definition Languages (DSDL). ISO/IEC 19757-2 was developed by ISO/IEC JTC 1/SC 34 and published in its first version in 2003.

== Comparison with W3C XML Schema ==
Although the RELAX NG specification was developed at roughly the same time as the W3C XML Schema specification, the latter was arguably better known and more widely implemented in both open-source and proprietary XML parsers and editors when it became a W3C Recommendation in 2001. Since then, however, RELAX NG support has increasingly found its way into XML software, and its acceptance has been aided by its adoption as a primary schema for popular document-centric markup languages such as DocBook, the TEI Guidelines, OpenDocument, and EPUB.

RELAX NG shares many features with W3C XML Schema that set both apart from traditional DTDs: data typing, regular expression support, namespace support, ability to reference complex definitions.

== Filename extensions ==
By informal convention, RELAX NG schemas in the regular syntax are typically named with the filename extension ".rng". For schemas in the compact syntax, the extension ".rnc" is used.

== Determinism ==
Relax NG schemas are not necessarily "deterministic" or "unambiguous".

== Converting Relax NG to DTD ==
Relax NG schemas can be converted to DTDs by applying Trang which can be found at: . The manual for Trang is located at . Note that Trang is unable to convert the OASIS DITA 1.3 schema to DTDs, failing with messages like:

 sorry, combining definitions with combine="choice" is not supported

== See also ==
- XML schemas
- DTD (Document Type Definition)
- Document Structure Description
- XML Schema (W3C)
- Schematron
- ODD (One Document Does it all)
- SXML
