= Upa, Estonia =

Village in Estonia

Coordinates: 58°17′N 22°33′E

Upa
- Village
- Interactive map of Upa
- Country: Estonia
- County: Saare County
- Parish: Saaremaa Parish
- Time zone: UTC+2 (EET)
  - Summer (DST): UTC+3 (EEST)

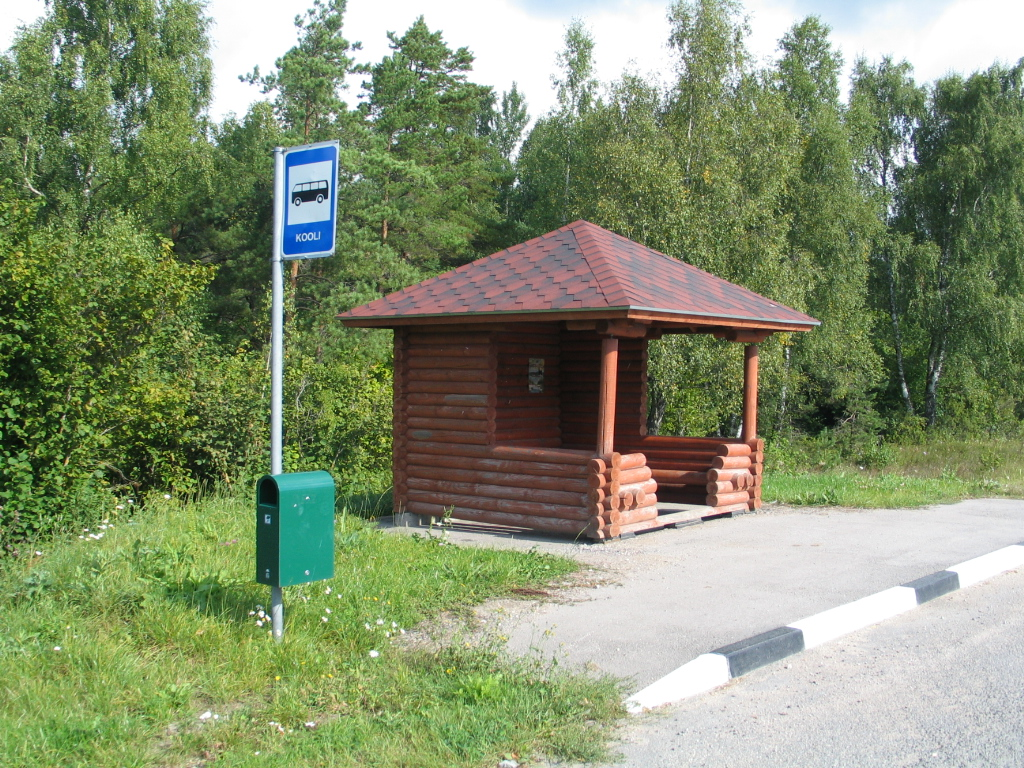
A "Kooli" bus stop in Upa village, Kaarma parish

Upa is a village in Kaarma Parish, Saare County in western Estonia.

Before the administrative reform in 2017, the village was in Lääne-Saare Parish.
