= PapiNet =

papiNet logo

papiNet is a global communication XML standard for the paper and forest products industries. papiNet facilitates the automation of the business processes within the industry, making it easier for the business partners to agree on data definitions and formats.

Main benefits are:

- A simpler process for dealing with multiple suppliers
- Reduced manual work
- Availability of information in “real time”
- Any company, regardless of their size, can use the standard

papiNet User Groups

In order to facilitate the implementation of the standard, User Groups (UGs) have been formed. The scope of those groups is to agree upon business rules, processes and data to be used in a specific paper market segment, basically a template.

Segment User Groups today:

1. Paper
2. Packaging
3. Norths American Fine Paper
4. Label Stock
5. Pulp
6. Recovered Paper
7. Logistics
8. WoodX (Woods Products)
9. Forest Wood Supply
10. XBITS (Book)

Interoperability

The papiNet Standard is an open and non-proprietary XML message standard.
This enables the standard to be utilized by any communication messaging service which allows the exchange of electronic business documents.
papiNet enables data sharing among the business partners in the paper industry, making it a fully interoperable standard.
