= DITA Open Toolkit =

- Initial release: 3 March 2005; 20 years ago
- Stable release: 4.4 / 31 January 2026
- Repository: github.com/dita-ot/dita-ot/
- Written in: Java, XSLT, Ant
- License: Apache License 2.0
- Website: www.dita-ot.org

DITA Open Toolkit (DITA-OT) is an open-source publishing engine for content authored in the Darwin Information Typing Architecture (DITA).

The toolkit's extensible plug-in mechanism allows users to add their own transformations and customize the default output, which includes:

- Eclipse Help
- HTML5
- Microsoft Compiled HTML Help
- Markdown
- PDF, through XSL-FO
- XHTML

Originally developed by IBM and released to open source in 2005, the distribution packages contain Ant, Apache FOP, Java, Saxon, and Xerces.

Many DITA authoring tools and DITA CMSs integrate the DITA-OT, or parts of it, into their publishing workflows.

Standalone tools have also been developed to run the DITA-OT via a graphical user interface instead of the command line.
