= XDR (video game) =

1990 video game

- Developer: Affect
- Publisher: UNIPACC
- Programmer: Tsutomu Yoshikawa
- Artist: M. Esaki
- Composer: S. Kaneda
- Platform: Mega Drive
- Release: JP: August 26, 1990
- Genre: Scrolling shooter
- Mode: Single-player

XDR (エックス・ディー・アール) (short for "X-Dazedly-Ray") is a horizontally scrolling shooter released in Japan in 1990 for the Mega Drive. It contains six levels.

== Plot ==
On the terrestrial planet Sephiroth, which is home to a variety of peaceful and prosperous advanced societies, an ancient evil has returned. A long time ago, a warmonger known only as Guardia was banished from the planet, but has finally returned with an entire space military. The Guardia Military soon invades Sephiroth and crushes its defenses with its long hardened space technology. Within time, a space fighter was developed to match the power of the Guardia Military. Based on Guardia's unknown desire for destruction and its own might, the ship was named the "XDR", or "X-Dazedly-Ray".

== Gameplay ==
Players pilot the titular ship through six different checkpoint-heavy levels, blasting various ground and sky forces. Rather than having Bomb weapons, the ship is equipped to fire a variety of different shots and smaller bombs. Players can collect power ups such as different firing weapons, ground-force bombs, a shield and Options, all of which are upgradable to three levels. Players can also change the ship's speed through four variations. Many of the end-level bosses require timed shots in exact hit points, similar to Gradius.

The XDR can use three different weapons from item pick-ups including its standard upgradable shot, missile pick-ups and Options. The ship can collect the Wide Beam/Vulcan shot, Laser and the Wave Shot. The missile pick-ups actually fire as ground force bombs that fire in four directions once fully upgraded. The ship's Options power up strangely in that the first selected Option encircles the ship, but the second and third power-ups cause the Option to follow the ship from behind rather than encircle it as well as multiply. The ship can also collect items such as a temporary shield and 1 Up icons.

== Reception ==
Reception

Review scores
Publication	Score
Aktueller Software Markt	0/12
Beep! MegaDrive	6.3/10
Computer and Video Games	47%
Joystick	48%
Mean Machines Sega	47%
Raze	60%
Tilt	8/20
Mega Drive Advanced Gaming	43%
MegaTech	47%
Power Play	52%
Sega Power	2/5
Sega Pro	54%

The Japanese publication Micom BASIC Magazine ranked XDR seventh in popularity in its November 1990 issue. The game received a 10.40/30 score in a poll conducted by Mega Drive Fan and a 3.0176/10 score in a 1995 readers' poll conducted by the Japanese Sega Saturn Magazine, ranking among Sega Mega Drive titles at the number 519 spot. It also garnered generally unfavorable reviews from critics.
