= XML validation =

XML validation is the process of checking a document written in XML (eXtensible Markup Language) to confirm that it is both well-formed and also "valid" in that it follows a defined structure. A well-formed document follows the basic syntactic rules of XML, which are the same for all XML documents. A valid document also respects the rules dictated by a particular DTD or XML schema. Automated tools – validators – can perform well-formedness tests and many other validation tests, but not those that require human judgement, such as correct application of a schema to a data set.

== Standards ==
- OASIS CAM is a standard specification that provides contextual validation of content and structure that is more flexible than basic schema validations.
- Schematron, a method for advanced XML validation.

== Tools ==
- xmllint is a command line XML tool that can perform XML validation. It can be found in UNIX / Linux environments.
- XML toolkit. The XML C parser and toolkit of Gnome – libxml includes xmllint
- XML Validator Online Validate your XML data.
- XML Schema Validator Validate XML files against an XML Schema.
