= Document Schema Definition Languages =

XML document validation schemes

Document Schema Definition Languages (DSDL) is a framework within which multiple validation tasks of different types can be applied to an XML document in order to achieve more complete validation results than just the application of a single technology.

It is specified as a multi-part ISO/IEC Standard, ISO/IEC 19757. It was developed by ISO/IEC JTC 1/SC 34 (ISO/IEC Joint Technical Committee 1, Subcommittee 34 - Document description and processing languages).

DSDL defines a modular set of specifications for describing the document structures, data types, and data relationships in structured information resources.

- Part 2: Regular-grammar-based validation – RELAX NG
- Part 3: Rule-based validation – Schematron
- Part 4: Namespace-based Validation Dispatching Language (NVDL)
- Part 5: Extensible Datatypes
- Part 7: Character Repertoire Description Language (CREPDL)
- Part 8: Document Semantics Renaming Language (DSRL)
- Part 9: Namespace and datatype declaration in Document Type Definitions (DTDs) (Datatype- and namespace-aware DTDs)
- Part 11: Schema Association

== See also ==
- RELAX NG
- Schematron
- DTD
- NVDL
- W3C Schema
