= Mystery meat (disambiguation) =

Mystery meat is a food of uncertain origin.

Mystery Meat may also refer to:

- "Mystery Meat", an episode of the cartoon series Danny Phantom
- Mystery meat navigation, a concept in software development
