= Hoverbox =

User interface element

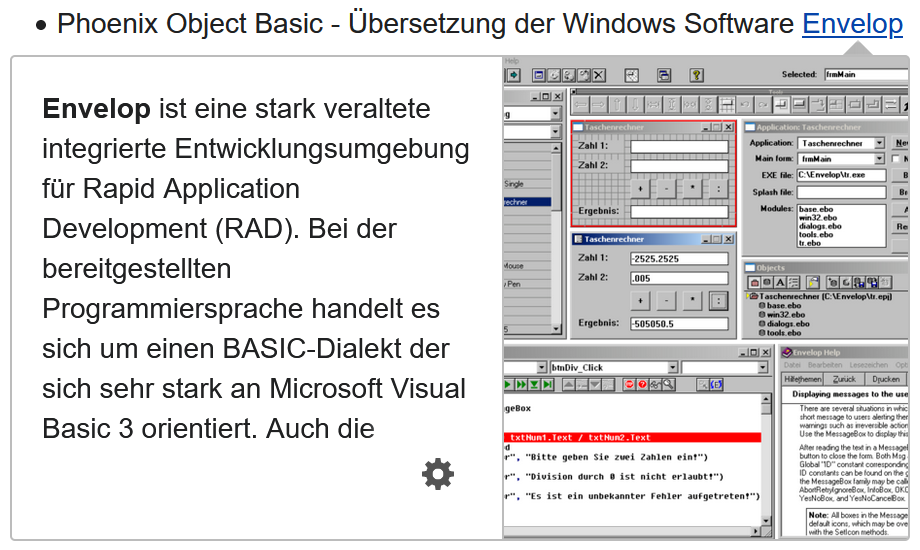
A Hoverbox used by Wikipedia to preview linked articles.

A hoverbox (also called a hover box, hovercard or hover card) is a popup window that is neither a tooltip nor a traditional popup, but is a popup that appears when the mouse is placed over an icon on the screen for a short period of time, without clicking. The hoverbox provides a web annotation tool which allows the reader of a web page to preview information outside of that webpage.

Hoverboxes differ from tooltips in that hoverboxes support HTML elements and can be used to display forms, graphics and lists among other html elements.

Hoverboxes differ from traditional popups in that the user must hover over a page element to activate. Hoverboxes are not used for advertising or survey collection.

Hoverboxes and other kinds of hover effects can be built with CSS.

Typically used to hide page elements that would otherwise clutter a website.

== See also ==
- Mouseover
- Graphical user interface
