= Column groups and row groups =

Colored column groups and row groups in the periodic table of the chemical elements.

In tables and matrices, a column group or row group usually refers to a subset of columns or rows, respectively. Short names or notational names include col group or colgroup, and row group or rowgroup. They can have varying uses depending on context:

- In mathematics, a partitioned matrix is an interpretation of a matrix as being broken down into submatrices which may be more precisely referred to as a collection of row groups and column groups
- In web development, colgroup is a standard HTML attribute and an HTML event attribute, for example used for color formatting of entire columns in HTML tables. The colgroup tag acts as a "parent container of one or more <col> elements". Rowgroup is another HTML attribute.
- In reporting (including business reporting, data reporting and financial reporting), colgroups and rowgroups can be used for constructing tables and matrices which dynamically adjusts the size of their columns and rows, respectively, by displaying the set of columns in the colgroup set (which again is a subset of the underlying data).
- In reporting, colgroups and rowgroups can also be used for grouping of collapsible categories in the presentation of a table (with or without aggregation for the groups). One example of a use case may be if a table contains a lot of detailed information, but there is a want to display summarizing information of groups in the same table.

== See also ==
- Column (database)
- Group by (SQL)
- Row (database)
- Row and column vectors in mathematics
- Row and column spaces in mathematics
- Table (database)
