= MMN =

MMN may refer to:

- Mismatch negativity
- Multifocal motor neuropathy
- Mystery meat navigation
- Matematikmaskinnämnden, the Swedish Board for Computing Machinery
- Mamanwa language, a Central Philippine language (ISO 639-3 code)
- Ticker symbol for Mannesmann AG, a German corporation
