= Ordered list =

The term ordered list can refer to:

- an ordered list (HTML)
- a mathematical sequence
- a mathematical tuple
