= Mystery meat =

Disparaging term for meat products

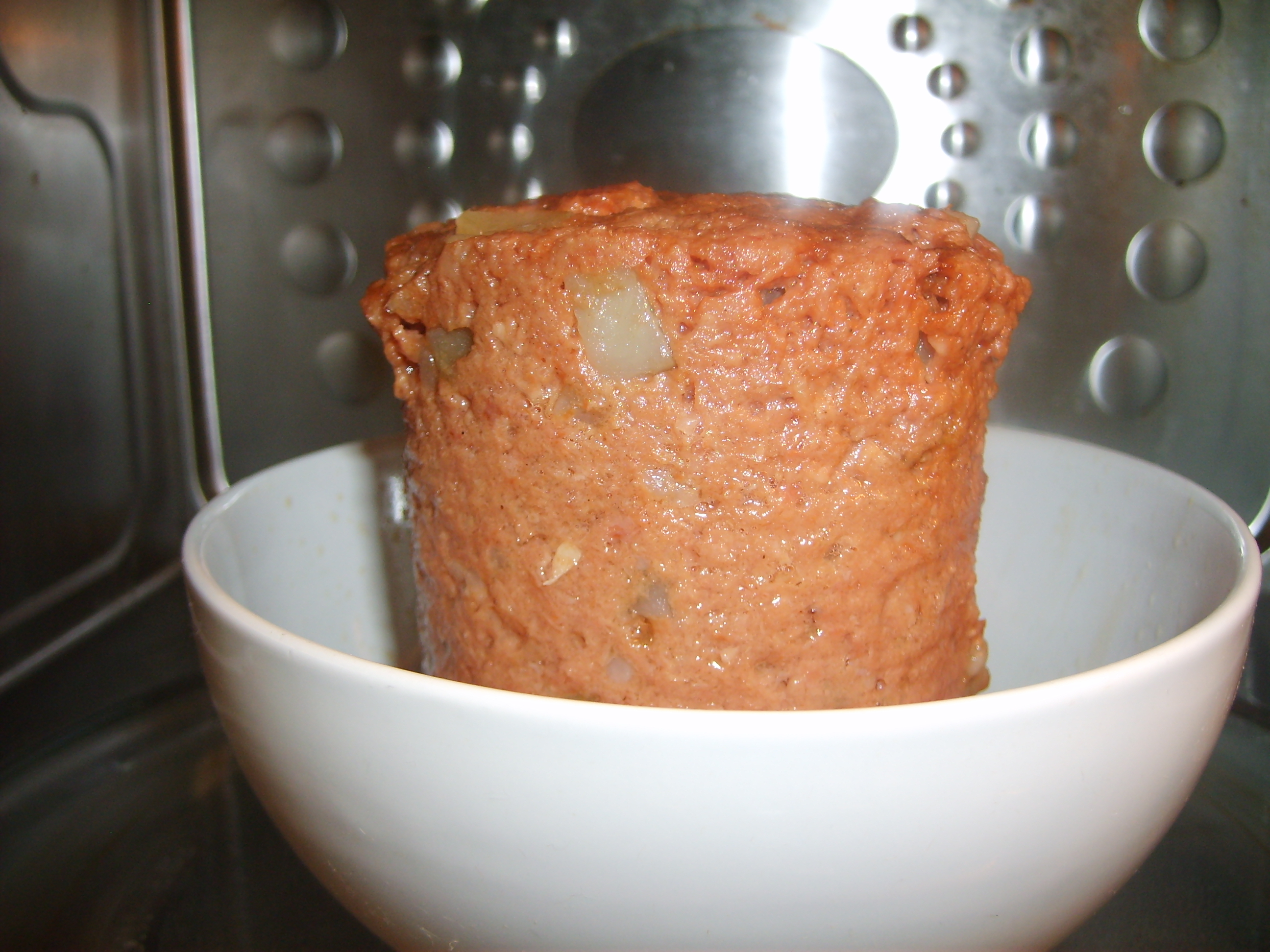
Mystery meat

Mystery meat is a disparaging term for meat products that have an unidentifiable source, typically ground or otherwise ultra-processed foods such as burger patties, chicken nuggets, Salisbury steaks, sausages and hot dogs. Most often the term is used in reference to food served in institutional cafeterias, such as prison food or a North American school lunch.

The term is also sometimes applied to meat products where the species from which the meat has come from is known, but the cuts of meat used are unknown. This is often the case where the cuts of meat used include offal and mechanically separated meat, or when non-meat substitutes such as textured vegetable protein are used to stretch the meat, where explicitly stating the type of meat used might diminish the perceived palatability of the product to some purchasers.

In 2016, Nissin, a Japanese food company that produces Cup Noodles, started to self-deprecatingly call one of their ingredients Nazoniku (lit. 'Mystery Meat') as part of their official marketing campaign. Nazoniku, or formally known as Daisuminchi (lit. 'Minced Meat Dice'), is made from pork, soybeans and other ingredients.

== See also ==
- Pink slime
- Mystery meat navigation
- Goyslop
