= Status bar =

Graphical control element

An example of a status bar in Emacs

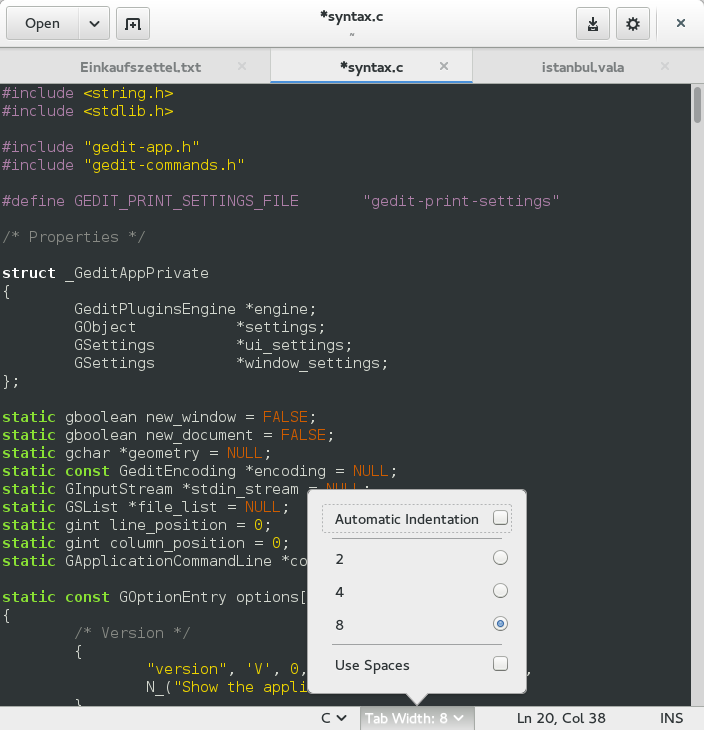
GTK-based gedit with a popover in the status bar

A status bar is a graphical control element which poses an information area typically found at the window's bottom. It can be divided into sections to group information. Its job is primarily to display information about the current state of its window, although some status bars have extra functionality. For example, many web browsers have clickable sections that pop up a display of security or privacy information.

A status bar can also be text-based, primarily in console-based applications, in which case it is usually the last row in an 80x25 text mode configuration, leaving the top 24 rows for application data. Usually the status bar (called a status line in this context) displays the current state of the application, as well as helpful keyboard shortcuts. One example is the 'vi' text editor of UNIX (from the 1970s) or newer Linux systems.

Status lines have been used for more than 30 years to display advisory messages in a predefined area, rather than as pop-up messages in center screen which can block the view of related information.

Sometimes, a video game places the player's vital information or Heads-up display (such as hit points, lives, and score) on a similar strip across the top or bottom of the screen; this is also referred to as a status bar.

== Usage ==
Status bars, and status lines before them, have been used for years to display advisory messages in a predefined area, predating dialog boxes which can block the view of related information behind the pop-up messages. The use of status bars (or status lines) involves both advantages and disadvantages:

Advantages of status bars:

- They allow viewing messages while also viewing the entire screen (although they take space away from the screen for their own display)
- They allow typing information while viewing status data
- They allow other menu options while viewing status data
- They continually show status during operation

Disadvantages of status bars:

- Status bars might restrict information to a one-line display (although a variable multi-line status bar/region could be used);
- Status bars typically cannot pop to the surface for critical messages when its parent window is layered below others (but are always visible in the parent window, which can be raised).
- Their location at the edge of the display may make them less noticeable than a dialog box

== Examples ==
- The status bar of a file manager often shows the count of items in the current directory, their total size, or the size of the currently selected item.
- The status bar of a web browser will be invisible or blank when the user is viewing a page, then display loading information when the user clicks a hyperlink.
- The status bar of a graphics editor will show information about the current image, such as its dimensions, color space, or resolution.
- In a word processor, the status bar often shows cursor position, the number of pages in the document, and the state of the caps lock, num lock, and scroll lock keys. Additionally, many word processors assign the insert key a behavior similar to that of these three, to allow toggling the insertion mode – the state of that is also displayed in the status bar.
- Text adventures often have a status line that displayed information such as the players location, game time, and score. Infocom's customer newsletter was named The Status Line after it was named The New Zork Times
- In a spreadsheet, the status bar shows similar information to word processors, but includes the ability to highlight cells and show the average, sum, maximum value, and so forth.

== See also ==
- Other window bars: menu bar, toolbar, address bar, title bar.
