= Mouseover =

User interface element

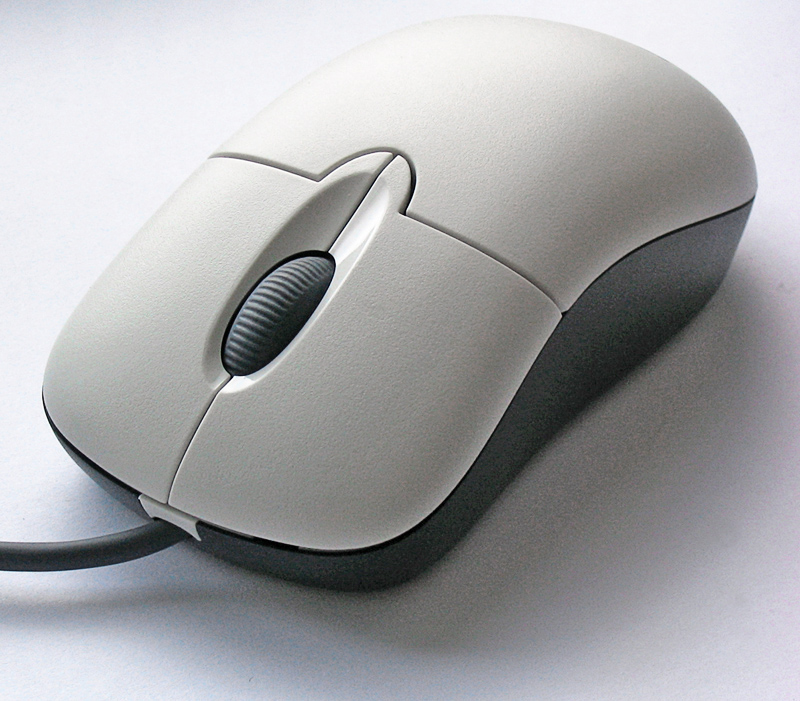
Mouseover events are typically triggered by the movement of a computer mouse.

In the field of computing and web design, a mouseover (also known as Tooltip) is an event occurring when the user moves the cursor over a specified point on a computer monitor using a computer mouse. Also called a hover effect, mouseovers are graphical controls that respond when a user moves their mouse pointer over a designated area. This area can be a button, image, or hyperlink. This simple action can trigger different responses. The element's color or appearance can change. Additional information or interactive content can be displayed. The mouseover effect is an essential part of user interaction. It adds layers of interactivity and responsiveness to websites and applications.

A mouseover is essentially an event that occurs when a user hovers their mouse pointer over a specific area on a digital interface. The user does not need to click or do any other input. Just placing the pointer over the element is enough to trigger the effect. In technical terms, a mouseover is an event. Web developers can use this event to create dynamic, responsive web experiences. Using HTML, CSS, and JavaScript, designers can define what happens when a user hovers over an element. This could be a visual change, displaying additional content, or even activating complex animations.

== Importance in UI/UX design ==
Mouseover effects are important for improving user interface (UI) and user experience (UX) design. They provide immediate visual feedback to users, indicating that an element is interactive and can be engaged with. This feedback helps guide users through a website or application, letting them know which elements are clickable or interactive without having to click first. From a UX perspective, mouseover effects contribute to a more intuitive and engaging experience. They make interfaces feel more dynamic and responsive, which can lead to higher user satisfaction and better overall interaction with the site. For example, a button that changes color when hovered over feels more alive and interactive than a static one, encouraging users to click and explore further. Mouseover effects can also be used to reveal additional information without cluttering the interface. For instance, tooltips—small text boxes that appear when hovering over an element—can provide helpful hints, definitions, or additional context without taking up permanent space on the screen. This ability to present information on demand is especially valuable in complex interfaces, where screen real estate is limited.

== Technical implementation ==
=== HTML/CSS mouseover ===
Mouseover effects are often used in web design. They are created using HTML and CSS. These technologies make it easy and efficient to make web elements more interactive and responsive. One of the key tools for creating mouseover effects in CSS is the :hover pseudo-class.

==== CSS pseudo classes ====
The :hover pseudo-class in CSS allows developers to define the styles that should be applied to an element. The styles are applied when the user hovers their mouse pointer over the element. Unlike static CSS properties, the :hover pseudo-class targets an element only when a specific condition (hovering) is met. The styles are not applied at all times. The :hover pseudo-class can be applied to almost any HTML element. This includes text, images, buttons, and links. By using :hover, the appearance of these elements change dynamically. This creates a more engaging and interactive user experience. For example, :hover can be used to change the background color of a button when a user hovers over the button. Another example is to add a shadow to an image when it's hovered over. The possibilities with :hover are vast, and the implementation is simple.

==== Example code ====
1. Changing background color on hover:

<!DOCTYPE html>
<html lang="en">
<head>
    <meta charset="UTF-8">
    <meta name="viewport" content="width=device-width, initial-scale=1.0">
    <title>Hover Background Color</title>
    <style>
        .hover-button {
            background-color: blue;
            color: white;
            padding: 10px 20px;
            border: none;
            cursor: pointer;
            transition: background-color 0.3s ease;
        }

        .hover-button:hover {
            background-color: green;
        }
    </style>
</head>
<body>
    <button class="hover-button">Hover Me</button>
</body>
</html>

2. Changing text color on hover:

<!DOCTYPE html>
<html lang="en">
<head>
    <meta charset="UTF-8">
    <meta name="viewport" content="width=device-width, initial-scale=1.0">
    <title>Hover Text Color</title>
    <style>
        .hover-text {
            color: black;
            font-size: 18px;
            text-decoration: none;
            transition: color 0.3s ease;
        }

        .hover-text:hover {
            color: red;
        }
    </style>
</head>
<body>
    <a href="#" class="hover-text">Hover over this text</a>
</body>
</html>

3. Adding shadow on hover

<!DOCTYPE html>
<html lang="en">
<head>
    <meta charset="UTF-8">
    <meta name="viewport" content="width=device-width, initial-scale=1.0">
    <title>Hover Shadow</title>
    <style>
        .hover-box {
            width: 200px;
            height: 200px;
            background-color: lightblue;
            margin: 50px;
            transition: box-shadow 0.3s ease;
        }

        .hover-box:hover {
            box-shadow: 0 0 15px rgba(0, 0, 0, 0.5);
        }
    </style>
</head>
<body>
    <div class="hover-box"></div>
</body>
</html>

=== JavaScript mouseover ===
CSS is good for making simple and effective hover effects. JavaScript allows more complex and dynamic behaviors when a user hovers over an element. JavaScript can control exactly what happens when a mouseover event occurs. This includes displaying tooltips, changing content, or triggering animations and transitions that are beyond what CSS can do. This is done using event listeners, particularly onmouseover and onmouseout.

Event listeners: onmouseover and onmouseout

JavaScript event listeners help developers run code when specific events happen. The onmouseover event listener runs code when a user's mouse pointer enters an element. The onmouseout event listener runs code when the mouse pointer leaves that element. These events can be added to HTML elements to make very interactive web pages.

- onmouseover: Triggers a function when the mouse pointer enters an element.
- onmouseout: Triggers a function when the mouse pointer leaves an element.

==== Example code ====
1. Displaying a tooltip on hover

<!DOCTYPE html>
<html lang="en">
<head>
    <meta charset="UTF-8">
    <meta name="viewport" content="width=device-width, initial-scale=1.0">
    <title>Tooltip on Hover</title>
    <style>
        .tooltip {
            display: none;
            position: absolute;
            background-color: black;
            color: white;
            padding: 5px;
            border-radius: 3px;
            font-size: 12px;
        }
    </style>
</head>
<body>
    <div id="hover-element" style="display:inline-block; padding:10px; background-color:lightblue; cursor:pointer;">
        Hover over me
    </div>
    <div id="tooltip" class="tooltip">This is a tooltip!</div>

    <script>
        const hoverElement = document.getElementById('hover-element');
        const tooltip = document.getElementById('tooltip');

        hoverElement.addEventListener('mouseover', function(event) {
            tooltip.style.display = 'block';
            tooltip.style.left = event.pageX + 10 + 'px';
            tooltip.style.top = event.pageY + 10 + 'px';
        });

        hoverElement.addEventListener('mouseout', function() {
            tooltip.style.display = 'none';
        });

        hoverElement.addEventListener('mousemove', function(event) {
            tooltip.style.left = event.pageX + 10 + 'px';
            tooltip.style.top = event.pageY + 10 + 'px';
        });
    </script>
</body>
</html>

2. Changing content dynamically on hover

<!DOCTYPE html>
<html lang="en">
<head>
    <meta charset="UTF-8">
    <meta name="viewport" content="width=device-width, initial-scale=1.0">
    <title>Dynamic Content Change</title>
    <style>
        #hover-box {
            width: 300px;
            height: 200px;
            background-color: lightcoral;
            text-align: center;
            line-height: 200px;
            font-size: 20px;
            color: white;
            cursor: pointer;
            transition: background-color 0.3s ease;
        }
    </style>
</head>
<body>
    <div id="hover-box">Hover over me</div>

    <script>
        const hoverBox = document.getElementById('hover-box');

        hoverBox.addEventListener('mouseover', function() {
            hoverBox.style.backgroundColor = 'darkslateblue';
            hoverBox.textContent = 'You are hovering!';
        });

        hoverBox.addEventListener('mouseout', function() {
            hoverBox.style.backgroundColor = 'lightcoral';
            hoverBox.textContent = 'Hover over me';
        });
    </script>
</body>
</html>

== Applications in modern web design ==
Mouseover effects are important to modern web design. They improve interactivity and user engagement in different ways. These effects allow designers to provide more information, improve navigation, and create visually appealing experiences without overwhelming users. I will now examine some of the most common uses of mouseover effects in web design.

=== Tooltips ===
Tooltips are small, informative pop-ups. They appear when a user hovers over an element. The elements can be icons, buttons, or text. The primary purpose of tooltips is to provide additional information or context. This helps avoid cluttering the interface. Tooltips are an excellent solution. They can deliver helpful hints, explanations, or details. These details might be too cumbersome to display directly on the page. For example, in a complex web application. It has numerous icons or buttons. Tooltips can explain the function of each element. This reduces the learning curve for new users. Tooltips only appear when needed. This keeps the interface clean and focused. Users can access extra information on demand. Tooltips are commonly found in forms. They can offer guidance on how to fill out specific fields. For instance, hovering over a question mark icon next to a form field. A tooltip could display an explanation. It could explain what information is required or provide an example of valid input.

Example:

Tooltips provide additional information when users hover over elements. Here is a simple example using HTML, CSS, and JavaScript.

<!DOCTYPE html>
<html lang="en">
<head>
    <meta charset="UTF-8">
    <meta name="viewport" content="width=device-width, initial-scale=1.0">
    <title>Tooltip Example</title>
    <style>
        .tooltip {
            position: relative;
            display: inline-block;
            cursor: pointer;
        }

        .tooltip .tooltip-text {
            visibility: hidden;
            width: 120px;
            background-color: black;
            color: #fff;
            text-align: center;
            border-radius: 5px;
            padding: 5px;
            position: absolute;
            z-index: 1;
            bottom: 125%; /* Position the tooltip above the text */
            left: 50%;
            margin-left: -60px;
            opacity: 0;
            transition: opacity 0.3s;
        }

        .tooltip:hover .tooltip-text {
            visibility: visible;
            opacity: 1;
        }
    </style>
</head>
<body>

<div class="tooltip">Hover over me
    <div class="tooltip-text">Tooltip text</div>
</div>

</body>
</html>

=== Navigation menus ===
Navigation menus are a crucial part of any website. They guide users to different sections or pages. Mouseover effects play an important role in enhancing the usability and functionality of navigation menus. This is particularly true for dropdown menus. A dropdown menu is a type of navigation menu. It reveals additional links or options when a user hovers over a main menu item. This allows users to explore subcategories or related pages without needing to click. This makes the navigation process smoother and more efficient. Mouseover effects in dropdown menus improve the overall user experience. They provide instant visual feedback. For example, when a user hovers over a menu item, the background color might change. Or an arrow might appear, indicating that more options are available. This makes it clear to the user that the item is interactive and will reveal further choices. Dropdown menus can be particularly useful on websites with a large amount of content. This includes e-commerce sites, where organizing products into categories and subcategories is essential for easy navigation.

Example:

Dropdown navigation menus are a common use of mouseover effects. Here is an example:

<!DOCTYPE html>
<html lang="en">
<head>
    <meta charset="UTF-8">
    <meta name="viewport" content="width=device-width, initial-scale=1.0">
    <title>Dropdown Menu Example</title>
    <style>
        ul {
            list-style-type: none;
            margin: 0;
            padding: 0;
            overflow: hidden;
            background-color: #333;
        }

        li {
            float: left;
        }

        li a, .dropdown-btn {
            display: inline-block;
            color: white;
            text-align: center;
            padding: 14px 16px;
            text-decoration: none;
        }

        li a:hover, .dropdown:hover .dropdown-btn {
            background-color: #111;
        }

        li.dropdown {
            display: inline-block;
        }

        .dropdown-content {
            display: none;
            position: absolute;
            background-color: #f9f9f9;
            min-width: 160px;
            box-shadow: 0px 8px 16px 0px rgba(0,0,0,0.2);
            z-index: 1;
        }

        .dropdown-content a {
            color: black;
            padding: 12px 16px;
            text-decoration: none;
            display: block;
            text-align: left;
        }

        .dropdown-content a:hover {
            background-color: #f1f1f1;
        }

        .dropdown:hover .dropdown-content {
            display: block;
        }
    </style>
</head>
<body>

<ul>
    <li><a href="#home">Home</a></li>
    <li class="dropdown">
        <a href="#" class="dropdown-btn">Dropdown</a>
        <div class="dropdown-content">
            <a href="#link1">Link 1</a>
            <a href="#link2">Link 2</a>
            <a href="#link3">Link 3</a>
        </div>
    </li>
</ul>

</body>
</html>

=== Image galleries ===
Image galleries are a popular feature on many websites. They are often used in portfolios, e-commerce sites, and photography blogs. Mouseover effects can improve the user experience in image galleries. These effects add interactive elements. They engage users and encourage them to explore more content. One common use of mouseover in image galleries is the zoom effect. When a user hovers over a thumbnail or image, the image might zoom in slightly. This gives the user a closer look at the details. This effect can be particularly useful in product galleries. Users want to inspect the quality or features of an item before making a purchase. Another use of mouseover in image galleries is to display additional information or previews. For example, hovering over an image could reveal the image's title, description, or even a short animation. This can make the gallery more informative and interactive. It offers users a richer experience. Mouseover effects can also be used to create slideshow-like transitions. Hovering over an image can change it to another version or angle. This gives users a dynamic view of the content without requiring clicks.

Example:

Mouseover effects can enhance image galleries, for example, by zooming in on an image when hovered.

<!DOCTYPE html>
<html lang="en">
<head>
    <meta charset="UTF-8">
    <meta name="viewport" content="width=device-width, initial-scale=1.0">
    <title>Image Gallery Zoom Example</title>
    <style>
        .gallery {
            display: flex;
            justify-content: space-around;
            flex-wrap: wrap;
        }

        .gallery img {
            width: 300px;
            height: 200px;
            transition: transform 0.3s ease;
        }

        .gallery img:hover {
            transform: scale(1.1);
        }
    </style>
</head>
<body>

<div class="gallery">
    <img src="https://via.placeholder.com/300x200" alt="Sample Image 1">
    <img src="https://via.placeholder.com/300x200" alt="Sample Image 2">
    <img src="https://via.placeholder.com/300x200" alt="Sample Image 3">
</div>

</body>
</html>

=== Interactive buttons ===
Buttons are essential in web design. They allow users to take actions like submitting forms, making purchases, or navigating to different pages. Using mouseover effects on buttons can make them more interactive and responsive. This enhances the overall user experience. When a user hovers over a button, the button's appearance changes. For example, the color may change, a shadow may be added, or the button may become slightly larger. This visual feedback tells the user that the button is active and ready to be clicked. This feedback is crucial for usability. It shows users which elements are interactive and encourages them to engage with the buttons. Buttons with mouseover effects also add sophistication to the design. For instance, a subtle animation that makes the button "lift" or "glow" when hovered over can make the website feel more dynamic and polished. Beyond visual effects, buttons can trigger other actions on hover. These actions can include displaying a tooltip with additional information, revealing hidden content, or playing a short animation or sound effect. These enhancements can make the interactions more enjoyable and intuitive.

Example: Mouseover effects can make buttons more interactive by changing their appearance dynamically.

<!DOCTYPE html>
<html lang="en">
<head>
    <meta charset="UTF-8">
    <meta name="viewport" content="width=device-width, initial-scale=1.0">
    <title>Interactive Button Example</title>
    <style>
        .interactive-button {
            background-color: #008CBA;
            border: none;
            color: white;
            padding: 15px 32px;
            text-align: center;
            text-decoration: none;
            display: inline-block;
            font-size: 16px;
            margin: 4px 2px;
            transition: background-color 0.3s ease, transform 0.3s ease;
            cursor: pointer;
        }

        .interactive-button:hover {
            background-color: #005f73;
            transform: translateY(-3px);
        }
    </style>
</head>
<body>

<button class="interactive-button">Hover Over Me</button>

</body>
</html>
