= Tooltip =

Graphical user interface element

A web browser tooltip displayed on a hyperlink, showing what the abbreviation stands for.

The tooltip (also known as infotip, hint, mouseover or hover text) is a common graphical user interface (GUI) element in which, when hovering over a screen element or component, a text box displays information about that element, such as a description of a button's function, what an abbreviation stands for, or the exact absolute time stamp over a relative time ("… ago"). In common practice, the tooltip is displayed continuously as long as the user hovers over the element or the text box provided by the tool. It is sometimes possible for the mouse to hover within the text box provided to activate a nested tooltip, and this can continue to any depth, often with multiple text boxes overlapped.

On desktop, it is used in conjunction with a cursor, usually a pointer, whereby the tooltip appears when a user hovers the pointer over an item without clicking it.

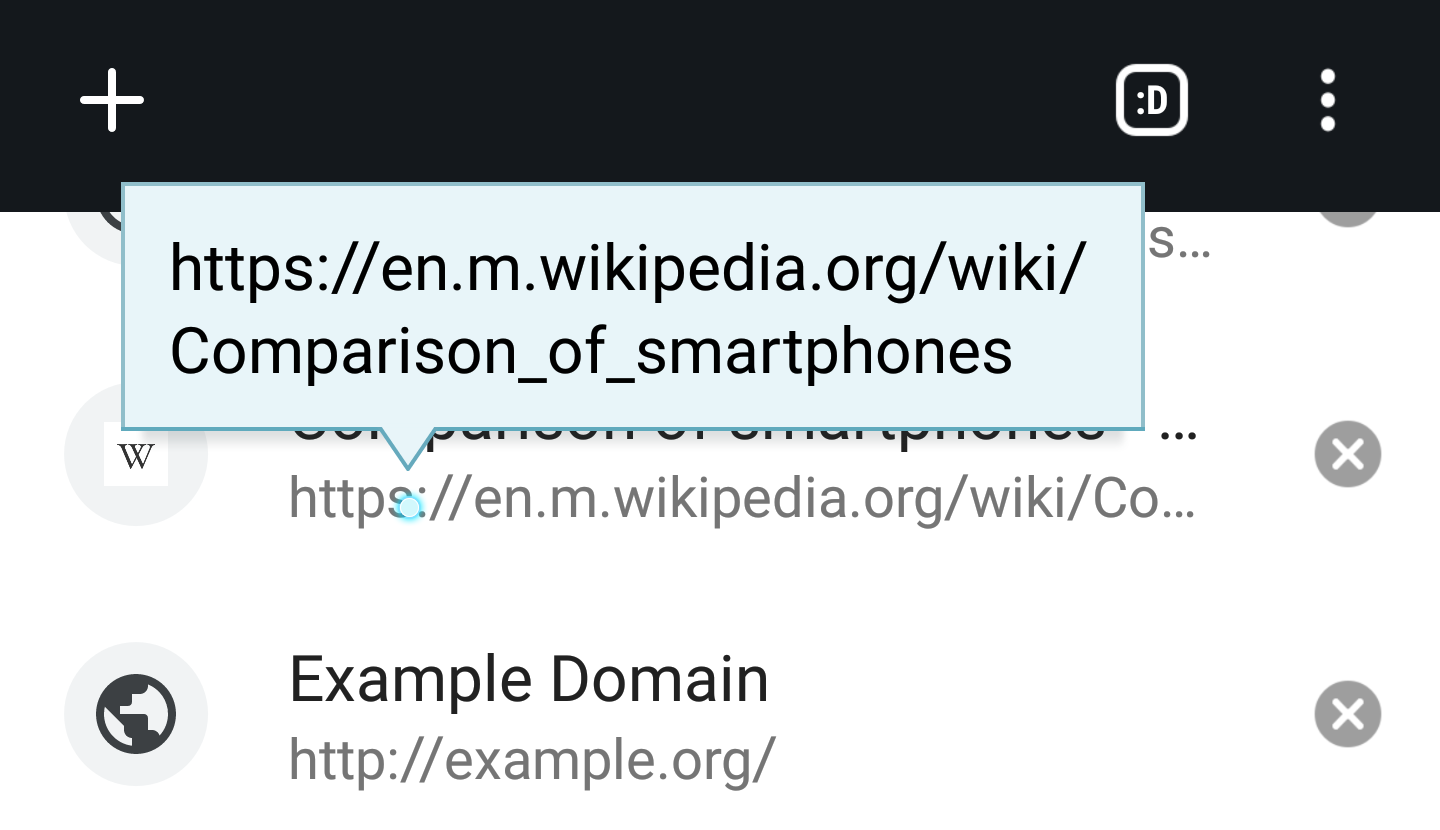
URL tooltip in Kiwi Browser, a Chromium derivative, revealed with the stylus on a Samsung Galaxy Note 4.

On touch-screen devices, a tooltip is displayed upon long-pressing—i.e., tapping and holding—an element. Some smartphones have alternative input methods such as a stylus, which can show tooltips when hovering above the screen.

A common variant of tooltips, especially in older software, is displaying a description of the tool in a status bar. Microsoft's tooltips feature found in its end-user documentation is named ScreenTips. Apple's tooltips feature found in its developer documentation is named help tags. The Classic Mac OS uses a tooltips feature, though in a slightly different way, known as balloon help. Some software and applications, such as GIMP, provide an option for users to turn off some or all tooltips. However, such options are left to the discretion of the developer, and are often not implemented.

== Origin ==
The term tooltip originally came from older Microsoft applications (e.g. Microsoft Word 95). These applications would have toolbars wherein, when moving the mouse over the Toolbar icons, displayed a short description of the function of the tool in the toolbar. More recently, these tooltips are used in various parts of an interface, not only on toolbars. The concept of tooltips as contextual help elements in user interfaces emerged with early graphical user interfaces to enhance usability.

== Examples ==
CSS, HTML, JavaScript, and other coding systems allow web designers to create customized tooltips.

Demonstrations of tooltip usage are prevalent on web pages. Many graphical web browsers display the title attribute of an HTML element as a tooltip when a user hovers the pointer over that element; in such a browser, when hovering over Wikipedia images and hyperlinks a tooltip will appear.

== See also ==
- Mouseover
- Hoverbox
- Infobox
- Dialog box
- Status bar
