= Content adaptation =

Design approach for distribution to mixed environments

Content adaptation is the action of transforming content to adapt to device capabilities. Content adaptation is usually related to mobile devices, which require special handling because of their limited computational power, small screen size, and constrained keyboard functionality.

Content adaptation could roughly be divided to two fields:

1. Media content adaptation that adapts media files.
2. Browsing content adaptation that adapts a website to mobile devices.

== Browsing content adaptation ==
Advances in the capabilities of small, mobile devices such as mobile phones (cell phones) and Personal Digital Assistants have led to an explosion in the number of types of device that can now access the Web. Some commentators refer to the Web that can be accessed from mobile devices as the Mobile Web.

The sheer number and variety of Web-enabled devices poses significant challenges for authors of websites who want to support access from mobile devices. The W3C Device Independence Working Group described many of the issues in its report Authoring Challenges for Device Independence.

Content adaptation is one approach to a solution. Rather than requiring authors to create pages explicitly for each type of device that might request them, content adaptation transforms an author's materials automatically.

For example, content might be converted from a device-independent markup language, such as XDIME, an implementation of the W3C's DIAL specification, into a form suitable for the device, such as XHTML Basic, C-HTML, or WML. Similarly, a suitable device-specific CSS style sheet or a set of in-line styles might be generated from abstract style definitions. Likewise, a device specific layout might be generated from abstract layout definitions.

Once created, the device-specific materials form the response returned to the device from which the request was made.

Another way is to use the latest trend responsive design based on CSS, covered in this article (RWD).

Content adaptation requires a processor that performs the selection, modification, and generation of materials to form the device-specific result. IBM's Websphere Everyplace Mobile Portal (WEMP), BEA Systems' WebLogic Mobility Server, Morfeo's MyMobileWeb, and Apache Cocoon are examples of such processors.

Wurfl and WALL are popular open source tools for content adaptation. WURFL is an XML-based Device Description Repository with APIs to access the data in Java and PHP (and other popular programming languages). WALL (Wireless Abstraction Library) lets a developer author mobile pages which look like plain HTML, but converts them to WML, C-HTML, or XHTML Mobile Profile, depending on the capabilities of the device from which the HTTP request originates.

GreasySpoon lets the developer build plugins for content editing, in JavaScript, Ruby (programming language), and more, just like the Firefox application GreaseMonkey.

Alembik (Media Transcoding Server) is a Java (J2EE) application providing transcoding services for variety of clients and for different media types (image, audio, video, etc.). It is fully compliant with OMA's Standard Transcoder Interface specification and is distributed under the LGPL open source license.

In 2007, the first large scale carrier-grade deployments of content transformation, on existing mass-market handsets, with no software download required, were deployed by Vodafone in the UK and globally for Yahoo! oneSearch, using the Novarra Vision solution. Novarra's content adaptation solution had been used in enterprise intranet deployments as early as 2003 (at that time, the platform was named "Engines for Wireless Data").

InfoGin, the 9-year-old content-adaptation company with customers like Vodafone, Orange, Telefónica and PCCW. The patented "Web to Mobile adaptation", Mobile Matrix Transcoder, Multimedia and Documents transcoders, Video adaptation supporte.

Launched in 2007, Bytemobile's Web Fidelity Service was another carrier-grade, commercial infrastructure solution, which provided Wireless content adaptation to mobile subscribers on their existing mass-market handsets, with no client download required.

== See also ==
- Progressive enhancement, layering technologies such that more features are added for successively more powerful clients.
- Adaptation (computer science)
- jQuery Mobile
- Responsive architecture is an analogous concept, applied to actual building architecture.
