= MAML =

MAML may refer to:

- Microsoft Assistance Markup Language, an XML-based markup language
- Model-Agnostic Meta-Learning, in meta-learning
- MamL domain (mastermind-like proteins), a protein domain
- Xdime, an xHTML extension formerly known as MAML
