= Empty element =

An empty element may be:

- An empty HTML element, one with tag(s) but no content (HTML element § Empty element)
- An empty XML element, one with tag(s) but no content (XML § Key terminology)
- An empty SGML element, one with tag(s) but no content (Standard Generalized Markup Language § EMPTY).

== See also ==
- Well-formed element
