= Composite Capability/Preference Profiles =

User agent specification

Composite Capability/Preference Profiles (CC/PP) is a specification for defining capabilities and preferences of user agents (also known as "delivery context"). The delivery context can be used to guide the process of tailoring content for a user agent.

CC/PP is a vocabulary extension of the Resource Description Framework (RDF). The CC/PP specification is maintained by the W3C's Ubiquitous Web Applications Working Group (UWAWG) Working Group.

== History ==
- Composite Capability/Preference Profiles (CC/PP): Structure and Vocabularies 1.0 became a W3C recommendation on 15 January 2004.
- A "Last-Call Working-Draft" of CC/PP 2.0 was issued in April 2007

== See also ==
- Resource Description Framework (RDF)
- User Agent Profile (UAProf)
- Wireless Universal Resource File (WURFL)
