= Frameset =

Frameset may refer to:

- Frameset (HTML), a group of named frames to which web pages and media can be directed
- Frameset (bicycle), the frame and front fork of a bicycle; sometimes also the headset and seat post
