= XHTML Basic =

XML-based structured markup language

XHTML Basic is an XML-based markup language designed for simple user agents with limited computing power, such as early mobile phones, PDAs, pagers, and set-top boxes. It is a subset of XHTML 1.1, defined using XHTML Modularization, containing a reduced set of modules for document structure, images, basic forms, tables, and objects.

XHTML Basic was designed to replace proprietary and specialized formats like WML and C-HTML, allowing developers to serve content to both desktop web browsers and handheld devices using a single codebase.

The initial specification became a W3C Recommendation in December 2000. Version 1.1, published as a Recommendation in July 2008, converged XHTML Basic with the Open Mobile Alliance's XHTML Mobile Profile. In November 2010, the Second Edition added an XML Schema definition and the lang attribute to improve accessibility. With the advent of modern mobile browsers and the widespread adoption of HTML5, dedicated mobile markup subsets fell out of use. On 27 March 2018, the W3C officially marked the specification as superseded.

== DOCTYPE ==
To validate as XHTML Basic, a document must contain the following Document Type Declaration, or DOCTYPE:

<!DOCTYPE html PUBLIC "-//W3C//DTD XHTML Basic 1.1//EN"
"http://www.w3.org/TR/xhtml-basic/xhtml-basic11.dtd">

A complete valid and well-formed example is:

<?xml version="1.0" encoding="UTF-8"?>
<!DOCTYPE html PUBLIC "-//W3C//DTD XHTML Basic 1.1//EN"
    "http://www.w3.org/TR/xhtml-basic/xhtml-basic11.dtd">
<html xmlns="http://www.w3.org/1999/xhtml" xml:lang="en">
  <head>
    <title>Hello</title>
  </head>
  <body>
    <p>Hello <a href="http://example.org/">world</a>.</p>
  </body>
</html>

Served with a MIME type of application/xhtml+xml.

== XHTML-Print ==
XHTML-Print, which became a W3C Recommendation in September 2006, is a specialized version of XHTML Basic designed for documents printed from information appliances to low-end printers.

== See also ==
- XHTML
- XHTML Mobile Profile
- List of document markup languages
- Comparison of document markup languages
