= W3C Device Description Working Group =

The W3C Device Description Working Group (DDWG), operating as part of the World Wide Web Consortium (W3C) Mobile Web Initiative (MWI), was chartered to "foster the provision and access to device descriptions that can be used in support of Web-enabled applications that provide an appropriate user experience on mobile devices." Mobile devices exhibit the greatest diversity of capabilities, and therefore present the greatest challenge to content adaptation technologies. The group published several documents, including a list of requirements for an interface to a Device Description Repository (DDR) and a standard interface meeting those requirements.

The group was rechartered in 2006 to work in public towards the development of the Application Programming Interface (API) for a DDR. Early in 2007, the group launched a wiki and a blog to add to the public mailing list. The group subsequently published a formal vocabulary of core device properties, and an API called the DDR Simple API, which became a W3C Recommendation in December 2008. The group closed at the end of 2008, but with the intention of maintaining the Web pages, blog and wiki through W3C volunteer effort.

== Publications ==
The DDWG published several W3C Working Group Notes and one W3C Recommendation.

- A W3C WG Note that articulates what the W3C and other organizations are doing or have already done with regard to device information. This document suggests an environment in which these technologies work together to meet the goals of content adaptation. The completed document was published on 31 October 2007.
- A W3C WG Note describing the ecosystem surrounding creation, maintenance and use of device descriptions. The completed document was published on 31 October 2007.
- A W3C WG Note describing a set of requirements for a reference repository of device descriptions. The completed document was published on 17 December 2007.
- A W3C WG Note describing a process to manage contributions to an initial core vocabulary, identification of key device properties, a formal initial core vocabulary and the identification of a maintainer for the core vocabulary. The details were contained in the Working Group Note describing the DDWG Core Vocabulary published on 14 April 2008.
- A W3C WG Note defining useful grouping and structure patterns in device descriptions. The Device Description Structures document was published as a Working Draft on 5 December 2008. The intention is that this document will be future input to other W3C groups.
- A W3C Recommendation defining a language-neutral programming interface to a Device Description Repository. The DDR Simple API was published on 5 December 2008.
- There is the possibility of future publications on the DDWG wiki describing implementations of the API in various languages, including Java, IDL, WSDL, C# etc.

Much of the DDWG's material was developed in public via the DDWG Wiki and through their public mailing lists.

== See also ==
- Device Description Repository
