= XHTML Mobile Profile =

Hypertextual computer language standard

Evolution of mobile web standards

XHTML Mobile Profile (XHTML MP) is an obsolete hypertextual computer language designed specifically for mobile phones and other resource-constrained devices.

It is an XHTML document type defined by the Open Mobile Alliance. XHTML-MP is derived from XHTML Basic 1.0 by adding XHTML Modules, with later versions of the standard adding more modules. However, for certain modules, XHTML-MP does not mandate a complete implementation so an XHTML-MP browser may not be fully conforming on all modules.

XHTML Basic 1.1 became a W3C Recommendation in July 2008, superseding XHTML-MP 1.2.

== Document Type Declaration ==
To validate as XHTML-MP, a document must contain a proper Document Type Declaration, (DTD) or DOCTYPE, depending on the version of specification followed

<!DOCTYPE html PUBLIC "-//WAPFORUM//DTD XHTML Mobile 1.0//EN"
"http://www.wapforum.org/DTD/xhtml-mobile10.dtd">

<!DOCTYPE html PUBLIC "-//WAPFORUM//DTD XHTML Mobile 1.1//EN"
"http://www.openmobilealliance.org/tech/DTD/xhtml-mobile11.dtd">

<!DOCTYPE html PUBLIC "-//WAPFORUM//DTD XHTML Mobile 1.2//EN"
"http://www.openmobilealliance.org/tech/DTD/xhtml-mobile12.dtd">

Note that a series of revisions have been issued to correct technical errors in the above DTDs, and the DTD format is more complex and less widely supported than that of standard HTML.

== MIME types ==
The MIME type for XHTML Mobile Profile is "application/vnd.wap.xhtml+xml". Conforming user agents should also accept "application/xhtml+xml" and "text/html". Many desktop browsers will only validate XHTML-MP at the display time, if an XML MIME type is specified.
