= Morfeo Open-Source Software Community =

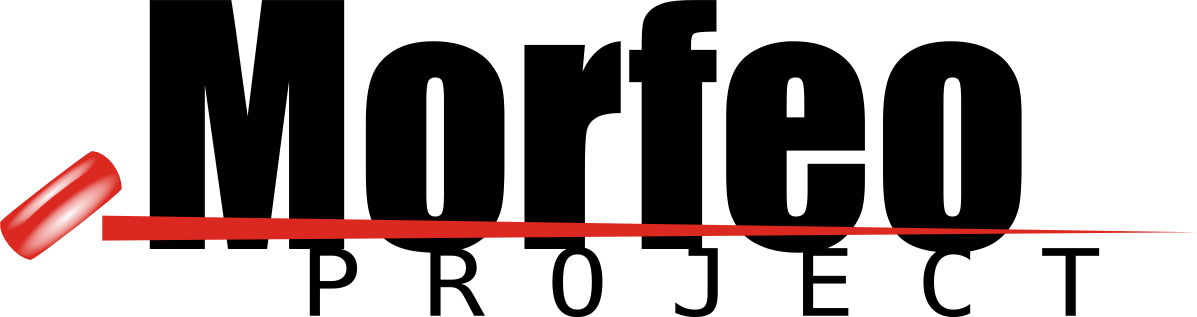
- Morfeo Project Logo
- Type: Open source software community
- Purpose: Promotion of open-source software; collaboration networks; technology transfer
- Location: Spain
- Region served: Spain
- Official language: Spanish
- Affiliations: Regional governments of Andalusia, Aragon, Castile-La Mancha, Extremadura, Catalonia and Valencia

Morfeo Open-Source Software Community is a group that promotes the use of open source software, focused on improving technical transfer between companies, and on generating social networks for collaboration, and to encourage for small-sized companies providing certain resources for carrying out this task.

The group is backed by the regional governments of Andalusia, Aragon, Castile-La Mancha, Extremadura, Catalonia and Valencia. It relies on its members' contributions, and Telefónica I+D releases proprietary software components and provides resources for the group.

The organization works with projects including MyMobileWeb, SMARTFlow (a workflow platform), CORBA Components and service-oriented architecture (SOA) components. Other projects include B2Booking, EasyConf, MyMobileSearch and UptaZone.
