= Volantis =

Software Company

Volantis Systems
- Type: Private
- Industry: Mobile (Internet)
- Founded: 2000
- Headquarters: Guildford, UK
- Key people: Mark Watson; Brett Nulf; Martin Gaffney; Jennifer Bursack
- Products: Framework; Mobile Site-builder; Mobile Banking; Mobile Self-care
- Services: Content management M-commerce solutions Portal Management; App creation Campaign management Subscription management
- Number of employees: 150
- Website: www.antennasoftware.com

Volantis was a mobile internet software company based in Guildford, England, now owned by Antenna Software, Inc. Volantis provides mobile applications and software solutions which give operators and enterprises access to a content delivery platform and a device database. Volantis was part of the W3C's Mobile Web Initiative, a member of the Open Mobile Alliance and an advocate of Open Standards.

== History ==
Volantis was founded by Jennifer Bursack, Martin Gaffney, Brett Nulf, and Mark Watson, who had all worked together at Tivoli Systems (a subsidiary of IBM) in the UK. In March 2000, the four founders resigned from IBM and approached investors under the name Unwired Ltd.

The company name was changed a few months later to Volantis Systems Ltd., taking its name from the constellation Volans. The company's logo is a representation of the constellation.

The initial idea taken to investors involved "developing a yellow pages-like directory service for mobile phones". This was soon dropped in favor of creating "technologies to enable companies to build web sites for all sorts of devices—smart phones, kiosks, digital televisions, gaming consoles, and...mobile phones".

The company received an initial investment of $3.2m from Kennet Partners in mid-2000. In 2001, the company received a round of funding led by Softbank Europe. The company grew quickly until the collapse of the Internet bubble and the events of 11 September 2001 forced Volantis to downsize and consolidate. Several significant telecommunications account signings (including Telefonica and Hutchison Whampoa) helped the company to recover and led it to change from offering "a multi-device service to a single device service", as "an enabler for mobile phone carriers."

Another funding round, led by Accel Partners, was completed in 2002, and in July 2005, Volantis raised a further $7.5 million, bringing the total venture capital raised to $31.6 million.

== Awards ==
Successful fund-raising, a series of high-profile client wins, and expansion into America, which "helped to boost sales 120% a year from £1.6m in 2003 to £7.9m in 2005" led to the company's inclusion in Fast Track's Tech Track 100 in 2006.

In 2010, Volantis was selected as a Distinguished Honoree in the Telecoms category at the Stevie Awards for international business achievement in recognition of their mobile self-care solution.

== Open Source contributions ==
Volantis released a Java-based open source framework for web applications building by mobile developers in early 2008.

== Acquisition ==
Volantis was acquired by Antenna Software in February 2011; the financial details of the acquisition were not released. Antenna Software was, in turn, bought by Pegasystems in 2013.
