= XHTML =

Markup language which places HTML in XML form

- Filename extension: .xhtml, .xht,.xml, .html, .htm
- Internet media type: application/xhtml+xml
- Uniform Type Identifier (UTI): public.xhtml
- UTI conformation: public.xml
- Developed by: WHATWG
- Initial release: 26 January 2000
- Type of format: Markup language
- Extended from: XML, HTML
- Standard: HTML LS
- Open format?: Yes

Extensible HyperText Markup Language (XHTML) is part of the family of XML markup languages which mirrors or extends versions of the widely used HyperText Markup Language (HTML), the language in which Web pages are formulated.

While HTML, prior to HTML5, was defined as an application of Standard Generalized Markup Language (SGML), a flexible markup language framework, XHTML is an application of XML, a more restrictive subset of SGML. XHTML documents are well-formed and may therefore be parsed using standard XML parsers, unlike HTML, which requires a lenient, HTML-specific parser.

XHTML 1.0 became a World Wide Web Consortium (W3C) recommendation on 26 January 2000. XHTML 1.1 became a W3C recommendation on 31 May 2001. XHTML is now referred to as "the XML syntax for HTML" and being developed as an XML adaptation of the HTML living standard.

== Overview ==
XHTML 1.0 was "a reformulation of the three HTML 4 document types as applications of XML 1.0". The World Wide Web Consortium (W3C) also simultaneously maintained the HTML 4.01 Recommendation. In the XHTML 1.0 Recommendation document, as published and revised in August 2002, the W3C commented that "The XHTML family is the next step in the evolution of the Internet. By migrating to XHTML today, content developers can enter the XML world with all of its attendant benefits, while remaining confident in their content's backward and future compatibility."

However, in 2005, the Web Hypertext Application Technology Working Group (WHATWG) formed, independently of the W3C, to work on advancing ordinary HTML not based on XHTML. The WHATWG eventually began working on a standard that supported both XML and non-XML serializations, HTML5, in parallel to W3C standards such as XHTML 2.0. In 2007, the W3C's HTML working group voted to officially recognize HTML5 and work on it as the next generation HTML standard. In 2009, the W3C allowed the XHTML 2.0 Working Group's charter to expire, acknowledging that HTML5 would be the sole next-generation HTML standard, including both XML and non-XML serializations. Of the two serializations, the W3C suggests that most authors use the HTML syntax, rather than the XHTML syntax.

The W3C recommendations of both XHTML 1.0 and XHTML 1.1 were retired on 27 March 2018, along with HTML 4.0, HTML 4.01, and HTML5.

=== Motivation ===
XHTML was developed to make HTML more extensible and increase interoperability with other data formats. In addition, browsers were forgiving of errors in HTML, and most websites were displayed despite technical errors in the markup; XHTML introduced stricter error handling. HTML 4 was ostensibly an application of Standard Generalized Markup Language (SGML); however the specification for SGML was complex, and neither web browsers nor the HTML 4 Recommendation were fully conformant to it. The XML standard, approved in 1998, provided a simpler data format closer in simplicity to HTML 4. By shifting to an XML format, it was hoped HTML would become compatible with common XML tools; servers and proxies would be able to transform content, as necessary, for constrained devices such as mobile phones. By using namespaces, XHTML documents could provide extensibility by including fragments from other XML-based languages such as Scalable Vector Graphics and MathML. Finally, the renewed work would provide an opportunity to divide HTML into reusable components (XHTML Modularization) and clean up untidy parts of the language.

=== Relationship to HTML ===
There are various differences between XHTML and HTML. The Document Object Model (DOM) is a tree structure that represents the page internally in applications, and XHTML and HTML are two different ways of representing that in markup. Both are less expressive than the DOM — for example, "-->" may be placed in comments in the DOM, but cannot be represented in a comment in either XHTML or HTML — and generally, XHTML's XML syntax is more expressive than HTML (for example, arbitrary namespaces are not allowed in HTML). XHTML uses an XML syntax, while HTML uses a pseudo-SGML syntax (officially SGML for HTML 4 and under, but never in practice, and standardized away from SGML in HTML5). Because the expressible contents of the DOM syntax are slightly different, there are some changes in actual behavior between the two models. Syntax differences, however, can be overcome by implementing an alternate translational framework within the markup.

First, there are some differences in syntax:

- Broadly, the XML rules require that every element be closed, either with a separate closing tag (e.g. </div>) or by using the self-closing syntax (e.g. <br/>), while HTML syntax permits some elements to be unclosed because either they are always empty (e.g. <input>) or their end can be determined implicitly ("omissibility", e.g. <p>).
- XML is case-sensitive for element and attribute names, while HTML is not.
- Some shorthand features in HTML are omitted in XML, such as (1) attribute minimization, where attribute values or their quotes may be omitted (e.g. <option selected> or <option selected=selected>, while in XML this must be expressed as <option selected="selected">); (2) element minimization may be used to remove elements entirely (such as <tbody> inferred in a table if not given); and (3) the rarely used SGML syntax for element minimization ("shorttag"), which most browsers do not implement.
- There are numerous other technical requirements surrounding namespaces and precise parsing of whitespace and certain characters and elements. The exact parsing of HTML in practice has been undefined until recently; see the HTML5 specification ([HTML5]) for full details, or the working summary (HTML vs. XHTML).

In addition to the syntactical differences, there are some behavioral differences, mostly arising from the underlying differences in serialization. For example:

- Behavior on parse errors differs. A fatal parse error in XML (such as an incorrect tag structure) causes document processing to be aborted.
- Most content requiring namespaces will not work in HTML, except the built-in support for SVG and MathML in the HTML5 parser along with certain magic prefixes such as xlink.
- JavaScript processing is different in XHTML, with minor changes in case sensitivity to some functions, and further precautions to restrict processing to well-formed content. Scripts must not use the document.write() method; it is not available for XHTML. The innerHTML property is available, but will not insert non-well-formed content. On the other hand, it can be used to insert well-formed namespaced content into XHTML.
- Cascading Style Sheets (CSS) are also applied differently. Due to XHTML's case-sensitivity, all CSS selectors become case-sensitive for XHTML documents. Some CSS properties, such as backgrounds, set on the <body> element in HTML are 'inherited upwards' into the <html> element; this is not to be the case for XHTML unless otherwise stated with the "initial" and "inherit" keywords.

=== Adoption ===
The similarities between HTML 4.01 and XHTML 1.0 led many websites and content management systems to adopt the initial W3C XHTML 1.0 Recommendation. To aid authors in the transition, the W3C provided guidance on how to publish XHTML 1.0 documents in an HTML-compatible manner, and serve them to browsers that were not designed for XHTML.

Such "HTML-compatible" content is sent using the HTML media type (text/html) rather than the official Internet media type for XHTML (application/xhtml+xml). When measuring the adoption of XHTML to that of regular HTML, therefore, it is important to distinguish whether it is media type usage or actual document contents that are being compared.

Most web browsers have mature support for all of the possible XHTML media types. The notable exception is Internet Explorer versions 8 and earlier by Microsoft; rather than rendering application/xhtml+xml content, a dialog box invites the user to save the content to disk instead. Both Internet Explorer 7 (released in 2006) and Internet Explorer 8 (released in March 2009) exhibit this behavior. Microsoft developer Chris Wilson explained in 2005 that IE7's priorities were improved browser security and CSS support, and that proper XHTML support would be difficult to graft onto IE's compatibility-oriented HTML parser; however, Microsoft added support for true XHTML in IE9.

As long as support is not widespread, most web developers avoid using XHTML that is not HTML-compatible, so advantages of XML such as namespaces, faster parsing, and smaller-footprint browsers do not benefit the user.

=== Criticism ===
In the early 2000s, some Web developers began to question why Web authors ever made the leap into authoring in XHTML. Others countered that the problems ascribed to the use of XHTML could mostly be attributed to two main sources: the production of invalid XHTML documents by some Web authors and the lack of support for XHTML built into Internet Explorer 6. They went on to describe the benefits of XML-based Web documents (i.e. XHTML) regarding searching, indexing, and parsing as well as future-proofing the Web itself.

In October 2006, HTML inventor and W3C chair Tim Berners-Lee, introducing a major W3C effort to develop a new HTML specification, posted in his blog that "[t]he attempt to get the world to switch to XML ... all at once didn't work. The large HTML-generating public did not move ... Some large communities did shift and are enjoying the fruits of well-formed systems ... The plan is to charter a completely new HTML group." The current HTML5 working draft says "special attention has been given to defining clear conformance criteria for user agents in an effort to improve interoperability ... while at the same time updating the HTML specifications to address issues raised in the past few years." Ian Hickson, editor of the HTML5 specification criticizing the improper use of XHTML in 2002, is a member of the group developing this specification and is listed as one of the co-editors of the current working draft.

Simon Pieters researched the XML-compliance of mobile browsers and concluded "the claim that XHTML would be needed for mobile devices is simply a myth".

== Versions of XHTML ==
=== XHTML 1.0 ===
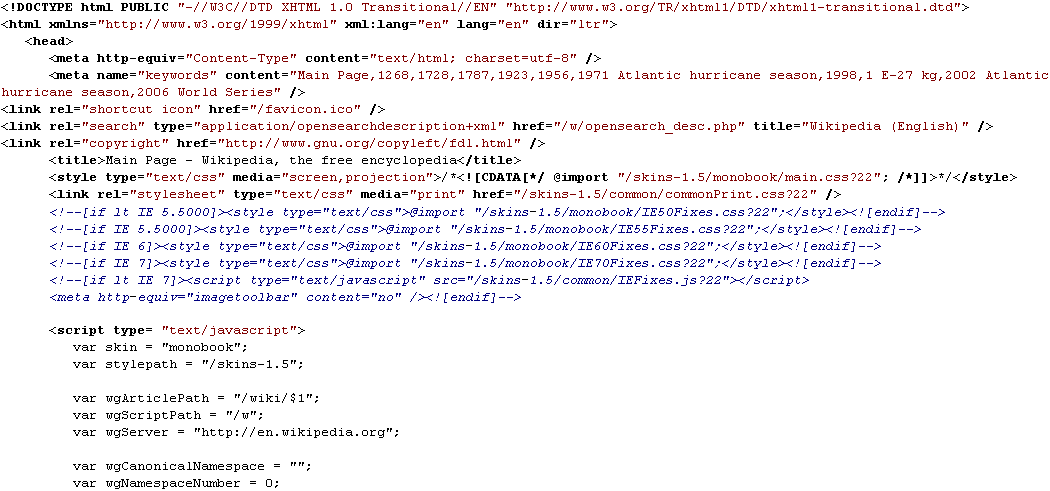
Before September of 2012, (Note: According to Wayback Machine, Wikipedia began using <!DOCTYPE html> on 18 September 2012; before that, <!DOCTYPE html PUBLIC "-//W3C//DTD XHTML 1.0 Transitional//EN" "http://www.w3.org/TR/xhtml1/DTD/xhtml1-transitional.dtd"> was used, starting from June of 2004.) Wikipedia used the XHTML 1.0 Transitional doctype and syntax, though the content was not served as application/xhtml+xml.

December 1998 saw the publication of a W3C Working Draft entitled Reformulating HTML in XML. This introduced Voyager, the codename for a new markup language based on HTML 4, but adhering to the stricter syntax rules of XML. By February 1999 the name of the specification had changed to XHTML 1.0: The Extensible HyperText Markup Language, and in January 2000 it was officially adopted as a W3C Recommendation. There are three formal Document Type Definitions (DTD) for XHTML 1.0, corresponding to the three different versions of HTML 4.01:

- **XHTML 1.0 Strict** is the XML equivalent to strict HTML 4.01, and includes elements and attributes that have not been marked deprecated in the HTML 4.01 specification. As of November 2015, XHTML 1.0 Strict is the document type used for the homepage of the website of the World Wide Web Consortium.
- **XHTML 1.0 Transitional** is the XML equivalent of HTML 4.01 Transitional, and includes the presentational elements (such as center, font and strike) excluded from the strict version.
- **XHTML 1.0 Frameset** is the XML equivalent of HTML 4.01 Frameset, and allows for the definition of frameset documents—a common Web feature in the late 1990s.

The second edition of XHTML 1.0 became a W3C Recommendation in August 2002.

=== Modularization of XHTML ===
Modularization provides an abstract collection of components through which XHTML can be subsetted and extended. The feature is intended to help XHTML extend its reach onto emerging platforms, such as mobile devices and Web-enabled televisions. The initial draft of Modularization of XHTML became available in April 1999, and reached Recommendation status in April 2001.

The first modular XHTML variants were XHTML 1.1 and XHTML Basic 1.0.

In October 2008 Modularization of XHTML was superseded by XHTML Modularization 1.1, which adds an XML Schema implementation. It was superseded by a second edition in July 2010.

=== XHTML 1.1: Module-based XHTML ===
XHTML 1.1 evolved out of the work surrounding the initial Modularization of XHTML specification. The W3C released the first draft in September 1999; the Recommendation status was reached in May 2001. The modules combined within XHTML 1.1 effectively recreate XHTML 1.0 Strict, with the addition of ruby annotation elements (ruby, rbc, rtc, rb, rt and rp) to better support East-Asian languages. Other changes include the removal of the name attribute from the a and map elements, and (in the first edition of the language) the removal of the lang attribute in favor of xml:lang.

Although XHTML 1.1 is largely compatible with XHTML 1.0 and HTML 4, in August 2002 the Working Group issued a formal Note advising that it should not be transmitted with the HTML media type. With limited browser support for the alternate application/xhtml+xml media type, XHTML 1.1 proved unable to gain widespread use. In January 2009 a second edition of the document (XHTML Media Types – Second Edition) was issued, relaxing this restriction and allowing XHTML 1.1 to be served as text/html.

The second edition of XHTML 1.1 was issued on 23 November 2010, which addresses various errata and adds an XML Schema implementation not included in the original specification. (It was first released briefly on 7 May 2009 as a "Proposed Edited Recommendation" before being rescinded on 19 May due to unresolved issues.)

=== XHTML Basic ===
Since information appliances may lack the system resources to implement all XHTML abstract modules, the W3C defined a feature-limited XHTML specification called XHTML Basic. It provides a minimal feature subset sufficient for the most common content-authoring. The specification became a W3C recommendation in December 2000.

Of all the versions of XHTML, XHTML Basic 1.0 provides the fewest features. With XHTML 1.1, it is one of the two first implementations of modular XHTML. In addition to the Core Modules (Structure, Text, Hypertext, and List), it implements the following abstract modules: Base, Basic Forms, Basic Tables, Image, Link, Metainformation, Object, Style Sheet, and Target.

XHTML Basic 1.1 replaces the Basic Forms Module with the Forms Module and adds the Intrinsic Events, Presentation, and Scripting modules. It also supports additional tags and attributes from other modules. This version became a W3C recommendation on 29 July 2008.

The current version of XHTML Basic is 1.1 Second Edition (23 November 2010), in which the language is re-implemented in the W3C's XML Schema language. This version also supports the lang attribute.

==== XHTML-Print ====
XHTML-Print, which became a W3C Recommendation in September 2006, is a specialized version of XHTML Basic designed for documents printed from information appliances to low-end printers.

=== XHTML Mobile Profile ===
XHTML Mobile Profile (abbreviated XHTML MP or XHTML-MP) is a third-party variant of the W3C's XHTML Basic specification. Like XHTML Basic, XHTML was developed for information appliances with limited system resources.

In October 2001, a limited company called the Wireless Application Protocol Forum began adapting XHTML Basic for WAP 2.0, the second major version of the Wireless Application Protocol. WAP Forum based their DTD on the W3C's Modularization of XHTML, incorporating the same modules the W3C used in XHTML Basic 1.0—except for the Target Module. Starting with this foundation, the WAP Forum replaced the Basic Forms Module with a partial implementation of the Forms Module, added partial support for the Legacy and Presentation modules, and added full support for the Style Attribute Module.

In 2002, the WAP Forum has subsumed into the Open Mobile Alliance (OMA), which continued to develop XHTML Mobile Profile as a component of their OMA Browsing Specification.

==== XHTML Mobile Profile 1.1 ====
To this version, finalized in 2004, the OMA added partial support for the Scripting Module and partial support for Intrinsic Events. XHTML MP 1.1 is part of v2.1 of the OMA Browsing Specification (1 November 2002).

==== XHTML Mobile Profile 1.2 ====
This version, finalized on 27 February 2007, expands the capabilities of XHTML MP 1.1 with full support for the Forms Module and OMA Text Input Modes. XHTML MP 1.2 is part of v2.3 of the OMA Browsing Specification (13 March 2007).

==== XHTML Mobile Profile 1.3 ====
XHTML MP 1.3 (finalized on 23 September 2008) uses the XHTML Basic 1.1 document type definition, which includes the Target Module. Events in this version of the specification are updated to DOM Level 3 specifications (i.e., they are platform- and language-neutral).

=== XHTML 1.2 ===
The XHTML 2 Working Group considered the creation of a new language based on XHTML 1.1. If XHTML 1.2 was created, it would include WAI-ARIA and role attributes to better support accessible web applications, and improved Semantic Web support through RDFa. The inputmode attribute from XHTML Basic 1.1, along with the target attribute (for specifying frame targets) might also be present. The XHTML2 WG had not been chartered to carry out the development of XHTML1.2. Since the W3C announced that it does not intend to recharter the XHTML2 WG, and closed the WG in December 2010, this means that the XHTML 1.2 proposal would not eventuate.

=== XHTML 2.0 ===
Between August 2002 and July 2006, the W3C released eight Working Drafts of XHTML 2.0, a new version of XHTML able to make a clean break from the past by discarding the requirement of backward compatibility. This lack of compatibility with XHTML 1.x and HTML 4 caused some early controversy in the web developer community. Some parts of the language (such as the role and RDFa attributes) were subsequently split out of the specification and worked on as separate modules, partially to help make the transition from XHTML 1.x to XHTML 2.0 smoother. The ninth draft of XHTML 2.0 was expected to appear in 2009, but on 2 July 2009, the W3C decided to let the XHTML2 Working Group charter expire by that year's end, effectively halting any further development of the draft into a standard. Instead, XHTML 2.0 and its related documents were released as W3C Notes in 2010.

New features to have been introduced by XHTML 2.0 included:

- HTML forms were to be replaced by XForms, an XML-based user input specification allowing forms to be displayed appropriately for different rendering devices.
- HTML frames were to be replaced by XFrames.
- The DOM Events were to be replaced by XML Events, which uses the XML Document Object Model.
- A new list element type, the nl element type, was to be included to specifically designate a list as a navigation list. This would have been useful in creating nested menus, which are currently created by a wide variety of means like nested unordered lists or nested definition lists.
- Any element was to be able to act as a hyperlink, e. g., <li href="articles.html">Articles</li>, similar to XLink. However, XLink itself is not compatible with XHTML due to design differences.
- Any element was to be able to reference alternative media with the src attribute, e. g., <p src="lbridge.jpg" type="image/jpeg">London Bridge</p> is the same as <object src="lbridge.jpg" type="image/jpeg"><p>London Bridge</p></object>.
- The alt attribute of the img element was removed: alternative text was to be given in the content of the img element, much like the object element, e. g., <img src="hms_audacious.jpg">HMS <span class="italic">Audacious</span></img>.
- A single heading element (h) was added. The level of these headings was determined by the depth of the nesting. This would have allowed the use of headings to be infinite, rather than limiting use to six levels deep.
- The remaining presentational elements i, b and tt, still allowed in XHTML 1.x (even Strict), were to be absent from XHTML 2.0. The only somewhat presentational elements remaining were to be sup and sub for superscript and subscript respectively because they have significant non-presentational uses and are required by certain languages. All other tags were meant to be semantic instead (e. g. strong for **strong emphasis**) while allowing the user agent to control the presentation of elements via CSS (e.g. rendered as boldface text in most visual browsers, but possibly rendered with changes of tone in a text-to-speech reader, larger + italic font per rules in a user-end stylesheet, etc.).
- The addition of RDF triple with the property and about attributes to facilitate the conversion from XHTML to RDF/XML.

=== XHTML5 ===
HTML5 grew independently of the W3C, through a loose group of browser manufacturers and other interested parties calling themselves the WHATWG, or Web Hypertext Application Technology Working Group. The key motive of the group was to create a platform for dynamic web applications; they considered XHTML 2.0 to be too document-centric, and not suitable for the creation of internet forum sites or online shops.

HTML5 has both a regular text/html serialization and an XML serialization, which is also known as XHTML5. The language is more compatible with HTML 4 and XHTML 1.x than XHTML 2.0, due to the decision to keep the existing HTML form elements and events model. It adds many new elements not found in XHTML 1.x, however, such as section and aside tags.

The XHTML5 language, like HTML5, uses a DOCTYPE declaration without a DTD. Furthermore, the specification deprecates earlier XHTML DTDs by asking the browsers to replace them with one containing only entity definitions for named characters during parsing.

== Semantic content in XHTML ==
XHTML+RDFa is an extended version of the XHTML markup language for supporting RDF through a collection of attributes and processing rules in the form of well-formed XML documents. This host language is one of the techniques used to develop Semantic Web content by embedding rich semantic markup.

== Valid XHTML documents ==
An XHTML document that conforms to an XHTML specification is said to be valid. Validity assures consistency in document code, which in turn eases processing, but does not necessarily ensure consistent rendering by browsers. A document can be checked for validity with the W3C Markup Validation Service (for XHTML5, the Validator. nu Living Validator should be used instead). In practice, many web development programs provide code validation based on the W3C standards.

=== Root element ===
The root element of an XHTML document must be html, and must contain an xmlns attribute to associate it with the XHTML namespace. The namespace URI for XHTML is http://www.w3.org/1999/xhtml. The example tag below additionally features an xml:lang attribute to identify the document with a natural language:

<html xmlns="http://www.w3.org/1999/xhtml" xml:lang="ar">

=== DOCTYPEs ===
In order to validate an XHTML document, a Document Type Declaration, or DOCTYPE, may be used. A DOCTYPE declares to the browser the Document Type Definition (DTD) to which the document conforms. A Document Type Declaration should be placed before the root element.

The system identifier part of the DOCTYPE, which in these examples is the URL that begins with http://, need only point to a copy of the DTD to use, if the validator cannot locate one based on the public identifier (the other quoted string). It does not need to be the specific URL that is in these examples; in fact, authors are encouraged to use local copies of the DTD files when possible. The public identifier, however, must be character-for-character the same as in the examples.

=== XML declaration ===
A character encoding may be specified at the beginning of an XHTML document in the XML declaration when the document is served using the application/xhtml+xml MIME type. (If an XML document lacks encoding specification, an XML parser assumes that the encoding is UTF-8 or UTF-16, unless the encoding has already been determined by a higher protocol.)

For example:

<?xml version="1.0" encoding="UTF-8" ?>

The declaration may be optionally omitted because it declares its encoding the default encoding. However, if the document instead makes use of XML 1.1 or another character encoding, a declaration is necessary. Internet Explorer prior to version 7 enters quirks mode, if it encounters an XML declaration in a document served as text/html.

== Backward compatibility ==
XHTML 1.x documents are mostly backward compatible with HTML 4 user agents when the appropriate guidelines are followed. XHTML 1.1 is essentially compatible, although the elements for ruby annotation are not part of the HTML 4 specification and thus generally ignored by HTML 4 browsers. Later XHTML 1.x modules such as those for the role attribute, RDFa, and WAI-ARIA degrade gracefully in a similar manner.

XHTML 2.0 is significantly less compatible, although this can be mitigated to some degree through the use of scripting. (This can be simple one-liners, such as the use of document.createElement() to register a new HTML element within Internet Explorer, or complete JavaScript frameworks, such as the FormFaces implementation of XForms.)

=== Examples ===
The following are examples of XHTML 1.0 Strict, with both having the same visual output. The former one follows the HTML Compatibility Guidelines of the XHTML Media Types Note while the latter one breaks backward compatibility, but provides cleaner markup.

Media type recommendation (in RFC 2119 terms) for the examples:
Media type	Example 1	Example 2
application/xhtml+xml	SHOULD	SHOULD
application/xml	MAY	MAY
text/xml	MAY	MAY
text/html	MAY	SHOULD NOT

Example 1.

<!DOCTYPE html PUBLIC "-//W3C//DTD XHTML 1.0 Strict//EN"
  "http://www.w3.org/TR/xhtml1/DTD/xhtml1-strict.dtd">
<html xmlns="http://www.w3.org/1999/xhtml" xml:lang="en" lang="en">
 <head>
 <meta http-equiv="Content-Type" content="text/html; charset=utf-8"/>
 <title>XHTML 1.0 Strict Example</title>
 <script type="text/javascript">
 //<![CDATA[
 function loadpdf() {
    document.getElementById("pdf-object").src="http://www.w3.org/TR/xhtml1/xhtml1.pdf";
 }
 //]]>
 </script>
 </head>
 <body onload="loadpdf()">
 <p>This is an example of an
 <abbr title="Extensible HyperText Markup Language">XHTML</abbr> 1.0 Strict document.<br />
 <img id="validation-icon"
    src="http://www.w3.org/Icons/valid-xhtml10"
    alt="Valid XHTML 1.0 Strict"/><br />
 <object id="pdf-object"
    name="pdf-object"
    type="application/pdf"
    data="http://www.w3.org/TR/xhtml1/xhtml1.pdf"
    width="100%"
    height="500">
 </object>
 </p>
 </body>
</html>

Example 2.

<?xml version="1.0" encoding="UTF-8"?>
<!DOCTYPE html PUBLIC "-//W3C//DTD XHTML 1.0 Strict//EN"
  "http://www.w3.org/TR/xhtml1/DTD/xhtml1-strict.dtd">
<html xmlns="http://www.w3.org/1999/xhtml" xml:lang="en">
 <head>
 <title>XHTML 1.0 Strict Example</title>
 <script type="application/javascript">
 <![CDATA[
 function loadpdf() {
    document.getElementById("pdf-object").src="http://www.w3.org/TR/xhtml1/xhtml1.pdf";
 }
 ]]>
 </script>
 </head>
 <body onload="loadpdf()">
 <p>This is an example of an
 <abbr title="Extensible HyperText Markup Language">XHTML</abbr> 1.0 Strict document.<br />
 <img id="validation-icon"
    src="http://www.w3.org/Icons/valid-xhtml10"
    alt="Valid XHTML 1.0 Strict"/><br />
 <object id="pdf-object"
    type="application/pdf"
    data="http://www.w3.org/TR/xhtml1/xhtml1.pdf"
    width="100%"
    height="500"></object>
 </p>
 </body>
</html>

Notes:

1. The "loadpdf" function is actually a workaround for Internet Explorer. It can be replaced by adding <param name="src" value="http://www.w3.org/TR/xhtml1/xhtml1.pdf"/> within <object>.
2. The img element does not get a name attribute in the XHTML 1.0 Strict DTD. Use id instead.

== Cross-compatibility of XHTML and HTML ==
HTML5 and XHTML5 serializations are largely inter-compatible if adhering to the stricter XHTML5 syntax, but there are some cases in which XHTML will not work as valid HTML5 (e.g., Processing instructions are non-existent in HTML, are treated as comments, and close on the first >, whereas they are fully allowed in XML, are treated as their own type, and close on ?>).

== See also ==
- Extensible User Interface Protocol
- HTML
- List of XML and HTML character entity references
