= Well-formed document =

A well-formed document in XML is a document that "adheres to the syntax rules specified by the XML 1.0 specification in that it must satisfy both physical and logical structures".

== Requirements ==
At its base level well-formed documents require that:

- Content be defined.
- Content be delimited with a beginning and end tag
- Content be properly nested (parents within roots, children within parents)

To be a well-formed document, rules must be established about the declaration and treatment of entities. Tags are case sensitive, with attributes delimited with quotation marks. Empty elements have rules established. Overlapping tags invalidate a document. Ideally, a well-formed document conforms to the design goals of XML. Other key syntax rules provided in the specification include:

- It contains only properly encoded legal Unicode characters.
- None of the special syntax characters such as < and & appear except when performing their markup-delineation roles.
- The begin, end, and empty-element tags that delimit the elements are correctly nested, with none missing and none overlapping.
- The element tags are case-sensitive; the beginning and end tags must match exactly. Tag names cannot contain any of the characters !"#$%&'()*+,/;<=>?@[\]^`{|}~, nor a space character, and cannot start with -, ., or a numeric digit.
- There is a single "root" element that contains all the other elements.

A valid XML document is defined in the XML specification as a well-formed XML document which also conforms to the rules of a Document Type Definition (DTD). According to JavaCommerce.com XML tutorial, "Well formed XML documents simply markup pages with descriptive tags. You don't need to describe or explain what these tags mean. In other words a well formed XML document does not need a DTD, but it must conform to the XML syntax rules. If all tags in a document are correctly formed and follow XML guidelines, then a document is considered as well formed."

An XML processor that encounters a violation of the well-formedness rules is required to report such errors and to cease normal processing. This policy, occasionally referred to as draconian, stands in notable contrast to the behavior of programs that process HTML, which are designed to produce a reasonable result even in the presence of severe markup errors in the spirit of Postel's law ("Be conservative in what you send; be liberal in what you accept").

== Importance ==
The concept of a well-formed document allows for a better understanding of the fundamental construction of XML. It helps to clarify XML beyond the typical sense of it. For example, while most XML Document Type Definitions utilize left and right angle brackets as content delimiters, strictly speaking this is not a necessity (though a delimiter should be terse and concise). The left and right angle bracket codes are a convention, albeit clear and distinctive, not an absolute requirement.

The concept of well-formed document also allows for the comprehension of the abstract nature of XML. In reality, there is no such thing as XML. Rather, XML is a principle that represents a set of behaviors and practices. It is possible to discuss types of XML, as expressed within a Document Type Definition (DTD).

Well-formed documents also bring into focus the issue of valid versus correct XML. According to the W3 Organization, valid documents are those that validate against a DTD. The rules of validity mean that a document complies with the restraints stated within a DTD. Thus, tags or entities must be in conformity to the rules and relations established within a DTD. However, there is no control on whether a tag or entity is correct. Thus a first level head tag could be applied to a second level head object and be valid, while incorrect.

The emphasis on well-formed documents has developed within the publishing industry where the use of left and right angle bracket delimited information has become problematic. Emphasis on the well-formed document allows for the definition, delimiting, and nesting of content to be managed within programs that are not XML, per se, but exhibit the characteristics or potential for being well formed.

This allows for easier transformation of content along the publishing chain, greater capacity to meet accessibility standards, and the opportunity to deploy computer-based tools to improve outcomes. It is also theorized that approaching content utilizing the theory of well-formed document could help the industry counter the current trend of the reduction in reading.

== Validation tools ==
There are several tools available to determine if a given XML document is well formed.

- Richard Tobin's XML validator
- Truugo's XML Validator
- W3Schools XML Validator

== See also ==
- XML schemas and validation
