= List of document markup languages =

The following is a list of document markup languages. You may also find the List of markup languages of interest.

== Well-known document markup languages ==
- HyperText Markup Language (HTML) – an ad hoc markup language that was originally created for the World Wide Web, took inspiration from the metalanguage SGML, and inspired many other markup languages
- Keyhole Markup Language (KML/KMZ) – an XML-based markup language used to exchange geographic information, originally, for use with Google Earth and, now also, other map programs
- Markdown – a simple, plain text markup language with multiple implementations, popular on blogs and content management systems
- Mathematical Markup Language (MathML) – a part of the HTML5 standard, an XML-based markup language used to describe mathematical notations as well as capturing their structure and content, intended to integrate mathematical formulae in the World Wide Web and other documents
- Scalable Vector Graphics (SVG) – an XML-based vector image format for defining two-dimensional graphics that has support for animations and interactive content
- TeX, LaTeX – a format for describing complex types and page layouts that is often used for mathematical, technical, and academic publications
- Wiki markup – one of a number of often lightweight markup languages used on wikis such as Wikipedia or WikiWikiWeb
- Extensible 3D (X3D) – a set of graphics file formats for declaratively representing 3D computer graphics that has support for interactive, network-capable content
- Extensible HyperText Markup Language (XHTML) – a markup language that mirrors HTML, written in the XML syntax
  - XHTML Basic – a subset of XHTML for simple (typically mobile, handheld) devices, meant to replace the Wireless Markup Language (WML) and Compact HTML (C-HTML) markup languages, as well as XHTML's own Mobile Profile (XHTML MP)

=== Metalanguages ===
- Standard Generalized Markup Language (SGML) – a metalanguage used to describe markup languages, of which XML and DocBook, as well as versions of HTML prior to HTML5 adhere to
- Extensible Markup Language (XML) – now the base of hundreds of other markup languages and document formats, an application and more restrictive subset of SGML that was designed to be easier to implement than a full SGML parser

== Lesser-known document markup languages ==
(including some lightweight markup languages)

- ABC notation – markup language for music scores in pure text
- Amigaguide – the Amiga hypertext documentation format, including multimedia support
- AsciiDoc – plaintext markup language similar to Markdown
- Chemical Markup Language (CML)
- Compact HyperText Markup Language (C-HTML) – used for some mobile phones
- Computable Document Format – used for interactive technical documents
- ConTeXt – a modular, structured formatting language based on TeX
- Darwin Information Typing Architecture (DITA) – modular open free format for technical and specialized documents
- DocBook – format for technical (but not only) manuals and documentation
- Encoded Archival Description (EAD)
- Enriched text – for formatting e-mail text
- GML
  - Generalized Markup Language (GML) – the Document Composition Facility (DCF) product provides GMLSS, a starter set of GML tags implemented as a set of SCRIPT/VS macros.
  - Geography Markup Language (GML)
  - Gesture Markup Language (GML)
  - Graffiti Markup Language (GML)
- GNU TeXmacs format – used by the GNU TeXmacs document preparation system
- Guide Markup Language (GuideML) – used by the Hitchhiker's Guide site
- Handheld Device Markup Language (HDML) – designed for smartphones and handheld computers
- Help Markup Language (HelpML)
- Hypermedia/Time-based Structuring Language (HyTime)
- HyperTeX – for including hyperlinks in TeX (and LaTeX) documents
- Information Presentation Facility (IPF) – a system for presenting online help and hypertext on IBM OS/2 systems, and the default help file format used by the cross-platform fpGUI Toolkit project
- Journal Article Tag Suite (JATS) – a NISO standard of XML used to describe and publish STEM scholarly journal articles
- LilyPond – a system for music notation
- LinuxDoc – used by the Linux Documentation Project
- Lout – a document formatting functional programming language, similar in style to LaTeX
- Maker Interchange Format (MIF)
- Microsoft Assistance Markup Language (MAML)
- Music Encoding Initiative (MEI)
- Music Extensible Markup Language (MusicXML)
- Nytril – a document programming language for engineering and scientific texts
- Open Mathematical Documents (OMDoc)
- OpenMath – a markup language for mathematical formulae which can complement MathML
- Parameter Value Language – stores mission data in NASA's Planetary Database System
- Plain Old Documentation (POD) – a simple, platform-independent documentation tool for Perl
- Pillar – a markup syntax and associated tools to write and generate documentation written in Pharo
- PUB – an early markup language with scripting support
- Remote Telescope Markup Language (RTML)
- reStructuredText (reSt) – plaintext platform-independent markup used as Python libraries documentation tool, multiple output formats (HTML, LaTeX, ODT, EPUB, ...)
- Retail Template Markup Language (RTML) – e-commerce language which is based on Lisp
- Revisable-Form Text (RFT) – part of IBM's Document Content Architecture to allow transfer of formatted documents to other systems
- S1000D – international specification for technical documentation related to commercial or military; aerospace, sea or land; vehicles or equipment
- Scribble – Markup language based on Racket
- Scribe – Brian Reid's seminal markup language
- Script – early IBM markup language on which GML is built
- Semantic, Extensible, Computational, Styled, Tagged markup language (SECST) – a more expressive and semantic alternative to Markdown that also transpiles to HTML
- Structured Information, Serialized Units (SiSU) – generalized markup language with several output formats
- SKiCal – a machine-readable format for the interchange of enhanced yellow-page directory listings
- Skriv – lightweight markup language
- Texinfo – GNU documentation format
- Text Encoding Initiative (TEI) – guidelines for text encoding in the humanities, social sciences and linguistics
- Textile – plaintext XHTML web text
- Time Management Markup Language (TMML) – for Time Management and rarely used for mobile alarm in 2008
- Typesetter roff (troff), GNU troff (groff)
- Typst – a document typesetting language for scientific texts
- Universal Document Output (UDO) – a lightweight markup language
- Wireless Markup Language (WML), Wireless TV Markup Language (WTVML)
- Extensible Application Markup Language (XAML) – an XML based user interface markup language
- Xupl – a C-style equivalent to XML

== Office document markup languages ==
- Compound Document Format
- Microsoft Office 2003 XML formats – Microsoft's predecessor to the Office Open XML formats
- Office Open XML (OOXML) – mainly developed by Microsoft, a standardized, open format for office documents that describes of a number of XML schemas, including the following:
  - SpreadsheetML – a schema for representing spreadsheets and charts
  - PresentationML – a schema for representing presentations
  - WordprocessingML – a schema for representing word processing documents
  - DrawingML – a supporting schema for representing charts, shapes, pictures, tables, diagrams, and document themes
- OpenDocument (ODF) – a standardized, open format for office documents originally conceived by a Technical Committee (TC) under the Organization for the Advancement of Structured Information Standards (OASIS) industry consortium
- OpenOffice.org XML – a standardized, open format for office documents and the predecessor of the OpenDocument format
- ReportML – report format language originating from Microsoft Access that, as of the 2016 edition, is not yet a part of Office Open XML standard
- Rich Text Format (RTF) – though not a markup language per se, since it was never meant for intuitive and easy typing, a Microsoft format for exchanging documents with other vendors' applications
- Uniform Office Format (UOF) – an open format for office documents that is being harmonised with OpenDocument

== See also ==
- Comparison of document markup languages
- Comparison of Office Open XML and OpenDocument
- Lightweight markup language
- Page description language
