= Dynatext =

DynaText is an SGML publishing tool. It was introduced in 1990, and was the first system to handle arbitrarily large SGML documents, and to render them according to multiple style-sheets that could be switched at will.

DynaText and its Web sibling DynaWeb won multiple Seybold and other awards, and there are eleven US Patents related to the DynaText technology.

== History ==
DynaText was developed by Electronic Book Technologies (EBT), Incorporated, of Providence, Rhode Island. EBT was founded by Louis Reynolds, Steven DeRose, Jeffrey Vogel, and Andries van Dam, and was sold to Inso corporation in 1996, when it had about 150 employees.

DynaText stands in the long tradition of hypermedia at Brown University, and adopted many features pioneered by FRESS, such as unlimited document sizes, dynamically-controllable styles and views, and reader-created links and trails.

DynaText heavily influenced stylesheet technologies such as DSSSL and CSS. XML chairman Jon Bosak cites EBT chief architect Steven DeRose as one of the originators of the notion of well-formedness formalized in XML, as well as DynaText for influencing the design of Web browsers in general; Jon Bosak produced SGML versions of the complete works of Shakespeare, the KJV Old Testament and New Testament, Book of Mormon, and Quran, and released them in 1994 bundled with Dynatext.

Inso corporation went out of business in 2002.

DynaText was demonstrated live by DeRose and David Sklar at "A Half-Century of Hypertext at Brown: A Symposium", held at Brown University on May 23, 2019, using a variorum edition The Wife of Bath's Tale, published in DynaText by Cambridge University Press.

== Technology ==
DynaText accepted SGML as input, and built a binary representation of the structure (similar to DOM for XML, but persistent), as well as a full-text inverted index of the text, elements, and attributes. Customers typically distributed such compiled e-books on CD-ROM or via network servers. Later versions of DynaText could also read SGML and XML on the fly, providing exactly the same interface.

Unlike many prior systems, DynaText was not limited to any particular DTD (or schema). Rather, customers could build style sheets in a simple language (also SGML-based), using properties very much like the later DSSSL, CSS, and XSL-FO. However, every property could have an expression as its value, which would be evaluated (if necessary) for each element the style applied to. Graphics, tables, formulae, and plug-ins could be included in documents.

Unlike nearly all prior SGML systems, DynaText was not limited to documents that could fit in RAM on the viewing or serving computer system. Users commonly created documents in the tens to hundreds of MB. DynaText customers included aerospace, workstation and other computer industry firms, government, literary and technical publishers, and others.

Full-text searches were based on an inverted index of words and other tokens (except for Japanese text, which was handled specially). Dynatext could report the number of "hits" for a given search, that occur within each section in the table of contents (by default, the table of contents appeared in a separate pane as an expandable outline, and clicking on any entry scrolled the full-text pane to the start of the corresponding section). Searches could also restrict hits to particular SGML element types, or sequences of types; refer to attributes; and use Boolean operators and parentheses. The "and" operator restricted its operands to occurring near each other, by default in the same paragraph or comparable element.
