= UDO (markup language) =

- Paradigm: Lightweight markup language
- License: GNU General Public License
- Website: UDO Home Page

Major implementations
- Free software program called "udo"

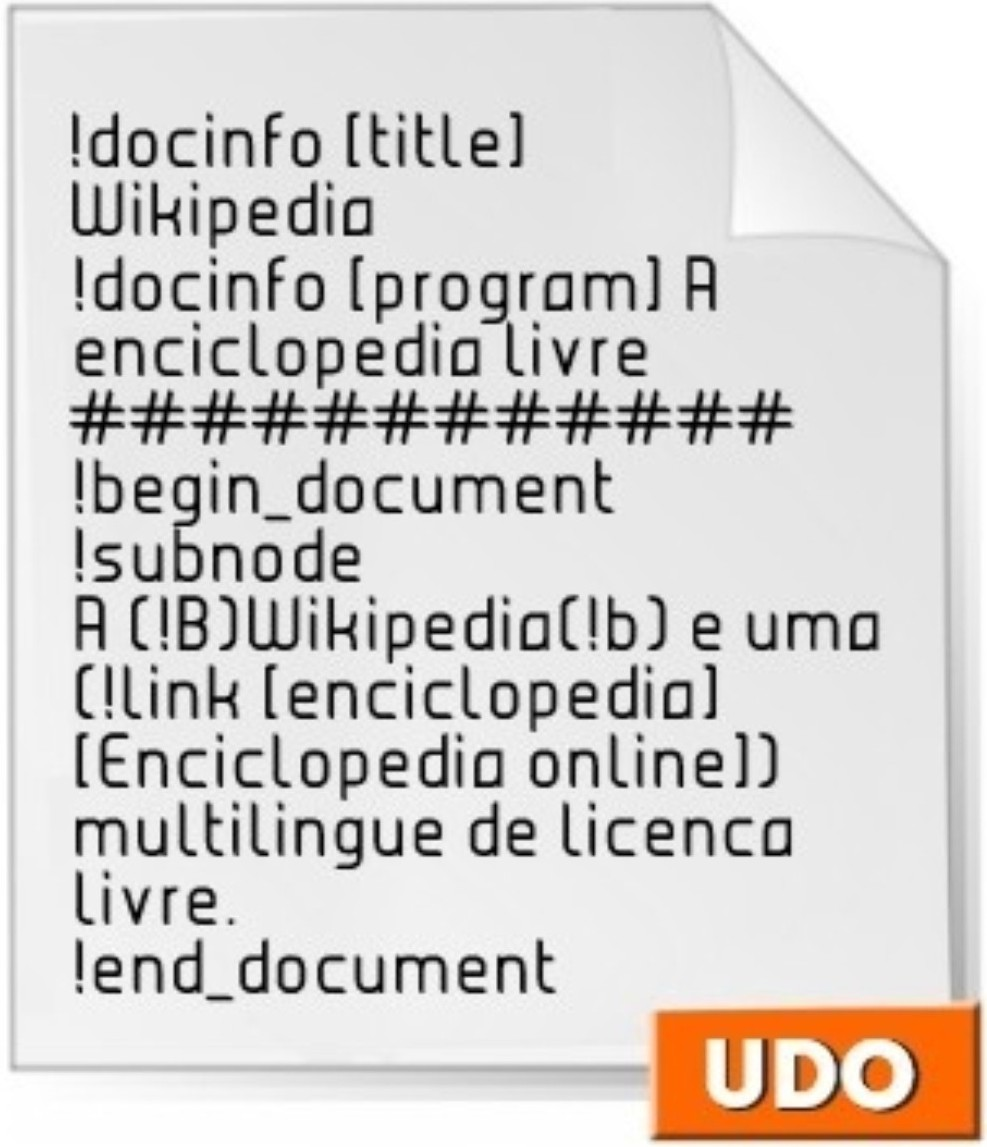
UDO document

UDO is a lightweight markup language. The acronym stands for Universal Document Output. Much like the more recent reStructuredText, it is well-suited for writing documentation.

A corresponding free software program called udo can be used to convert a source document into other formats such as Apple-QuickView, ASCII, HTML, Texinfo, LinuxDoc-SGML, man page, Pure-C-Help, Rich Text Format, ST-Guide, LaTeX, Turbo Vision Help or Windows Help. UDO is released under the GNU General Public License.
