= Steven DeRose =

American computer scientist

Steven J DeRose (born 1960) is a computer scientist noted for his contributions to computational linguistics and to key standards related to document processing, mostly around ISO's Standard Generalized Markup Language (SGML) and W3C's Extensible Markup Language (XML).

His contributions include the following:

- HyTime
- Text Encoding Initiative
- XPath –- editor
- XPointer –- editor
- XLink –- editor
- OSIS—chairman
- XML

He served as Chief Scientist of the Scholarly Technology Group, and Adjunct Associate Professor of Computer Science, at Brown University. While there he received NSF and NEH grants and contributed heavily to the Open eBook and Encoded Archival Description standards. Previously, he was co-founder and Chief Scientist at Electronic Book Technologies, Inc., where he designed the first SGML browser (Dynatext), which earned 11 US Patents and won Seybold and other awards.

His 1987 article with James Coombs and Allen Renear, "Markup Systems and the Future of Scholarly Text Processing", is a seminal source for the theory of markup systems, and has been widely cited and reprinted. The article "What is Text, Really?" has also been widely cited and reprinted, and led to several follow-on articles In addition, he has published 2 books (Making Hypermedia Work: A User's Guide to HyTime and The SGML FAQ Book); as well as articles in a variety of journals, magazines, and proceedings.

He has given papers and tutorials at the ACM Hypertext Conference and various SGML and XML conferences, a keynote address at the ACM Conference on Very Large DataBases (VLDB), and a plenary talk at the Text Encoding Initiative 10 Conference.

In Computational Linguistics, he is known for pioneering the use of dynamic programming methods for part-of-speech tagging (DeRose 1988, 1990).

== Selected publications ==
1. DeRose, Steven J. (1988). "Grammatical category disambiguation by statistical optimization". Computational Linguistics. Vol. 14, no. 1. pp. 31–39.
2. DeRose, Steven J. (1990). Stochastic Methods for Resolution of Grammatical Category Ambiguity in Inflected and Uninflected Languages (Thesis). Providence, RI: Brown University Department of Cognitive and Linguistic Sciences. Archived from the original on 2018-08-19.
3. DeRose, Steven J. & David G. Durand (1994). Making Hypermedia Work: A User's Guide to HyTime. Kluwer Academic Publishers. ISBN 978-0-7923-9432-7.
4. DeRose, Steven J (1997). The SGML FAQ Book. Kluwer Academic Publishers. ISBN 978-0-7923-9943-8.
