= Document preparation system =

Document preparation system may refer to:

- List of word processor programs
- List of document markup languages

== See also ==
- Typesetting
- LaTeX, a document preparation system
