= Cellpadding =

Amount of space between the border of a table cell and its contents

Cellpadding (along with cellspacing) is a term used in the computer language HTML (Hypertext Markup Language). When used in conjunction with the table element, it specifies the amount of space between the border of a table cell and its contents. Cellpadding is an attribute of an individual cell in a table, so each cell in a table can be assigned its own cellpadding value, if not assigned however, the default value for cellpadding is 1. The cellpadding attribute was added to version 2.0 of the HTML language in 1996. Space between text and borders is an important element of web page design, because it improves the readability of text and visual appeal of graphics in table cells. Cellpadding makes this possible, and web design experts emphasize the importance of carefully selecting the cellpadding values. The same effect can be accomplished in CSS.

Presentational HTML elements such as cellpadding are becoming obsolete, as more and more web designers move to the use of CSS and other newer methods of creating web pages, available in HTML versions 5 and newer. One reason for this is that, although cellpadding makes reading easier for sighted users, text-to-speech software for non-sighted users has difficulty in interpreting complex table data. However, because visual spacing of text in tables is still important, developers of these newer methods continue to use the term "cellpadding" or "cell padding" to describe whatever process is used to provide it.
