= AAP DTD =

In computing, AAP DTD (variously known as AAP Electronic Manuscript Standard, AAP standard, AAP/EPSIG standard, and ANSI/NISO Z39.59) is a set of three SGML Document Type Definitions (book, journal, and article) for scientific documents, defined by the Association of American Publishers. It was ratified as a U.S. standard under the name ANSI/NISO Z39.59 in 1988, and evolved into the international ISO 12083 standard in 1993. It was supplanted as a U.S. standard by ANSI/ISO 12083 in 1995.

== Development and standard ratifications ==
From 1983 to 1987, the Association of American Publishers (AAP), a coalition of book and journal publishers in North America, sponsored the Electronic Manuscript Project, the earliest effort to develop a commercial SGML application. The project sought to create an SGML standard for book, journal, and article creation. With the technical work led by Aspen Systems, over thirty information-processing organizations contributed to the project, including the US Library of Congress, the American Society of Indexers, the IEEE, the American Chemical Society, the American Institute of Physics, and the American Mathematical Society.

Two preliminary works with restricted distribution were produced in 1985, the draft AAP DTD and author guidelines.

The Electronic Publishing Special Interest Group (EPSIG) was founded to take over responsibility for the work from AAP. The consortium, sponsored by the Online Computer Library Center, recommended that the DTDs developed by the Electronic Manuscript Project should become an American standard. With the support of the AAP and the Graphic Communications Association, the AAP DTDs were ratified in 1988 as the American National Standards Institute's Electronic Manuscript Preparation and Markup (ANSI/NISO Z39.59) standard. Unlike the DTDs that ANSI/NISO Z39.59 specifies for books, serials and articles, the markup recommended for mathematics and tables is not part of the standard. As the standard is based on ASCII character encoding, it includes a large set of entity definitions for special characters.

The AAP and EPSIG continued their collaboration and published a revised version of the specification in 1989.

The AAP and the European Physical Society further collaborated on a standard method for marking up mathematical notation and tables in scientific documents. Building on this work, Eric van Herwijnen, then head of the text processing section at CERN, edited the specification for adoption by the International Organization for Standardization as ISO 12083, which was first published in 1993, revised in 1994 and last reconfirmed in 2016. ISO 12083 specifies four DTDs: Article, Book, Serial, and Math.

In 1995 ANSI/NISO Z39.59:1988 was superseded by ISO 12083, which was adopted as U.S. standard ANSI/NISO/ISO 12083-1995 (R2009) Electronic Manuscript Preparation and Markup. This U.S. standard was withdrawn in 2016.

== Usage ==
The AAP DTDs counted the academic publishing house Elsevier among their earliest users and found significant acceptance in the emerging CD-ROM publishing industry.

AAP DTD also informed other SGML applications, such as CERN's SGMLguid, the Elsevier Science Article DTD, and EWS MAJOUR, a DTD developed between 1989 and 1991 in an effort led by the publishing houses Elsevier, Wolters Kluwer, and Springer.

== Bibliography ==
- Cave, Francis (2003-12-01). "Article Metadata Standards: An Historical Review". OCLC Systems & Services: International Digital Library Perspectives. 19 (4): 144–148. doi:10.1108/10650750310698766. ISSN 1065-075X.
- Goossens, Michel; Saarela, Janne (November 1995). "A practical introduction to SGML". TUGboat. 16 (2): 103–145.
- Kasdorf, William E. (2003). "Markup: XML & Related Technologies". In William E. Kasdorf (ed.). The Columbia Guide to Digital Publishing. New York: Columbia University Press. pp. 65–154. ISBN 978-0-231-12499-7.
- Smith, Joan M. (1992). SGML and Related Standards. New York: Ellis Horwood. ISBN 0-13-806506-3.
- van Herwijnen, Eric (1994). Practical SGML. Dordrecht, Netherlands: Kluwer. ISBN 978-0-7923-9434-1.
