= ISO 12083 =

ISO 12083 is an international SGML standard for document interchange between authors and publishers. It features separate Document Type Definitions for books, serials, articles, and math. Derived from AAP DTD, it was first published in 1993, revised in 1994, and last confirmed in 2021.

== History ==
In 1983, the Association of American Publishers (AAP), a coalition of book and journal publishers in North America, initiated efforts to create an SGML application named AAP DTD for academic publishing. In 1988, the AAP DTD became the American National Standards Institute's Electronic Manuscript Preparation and Markup (ANSI/NISO Z39.59) standard. Being based on the ASCII character encoding standard, it includes a large set of entity definitions for special characters.

The AAP and EPSIG continued their collaboration and published a revised version of the specification in 1989, identifying three document types in the field of publishing: Book, Serial Publication, and Article, for each of which the revised specification offers a DTD.

The AAP and the European Physical Society (EPS) further collaborated on a standard method for marking up tables and mathematical notation in scientific documents. Building on this work, Eric van Herwijnen, then head of the text processing section at CERN, edited the specification for adoption by the International Organization for Standardization as ISO 12083, first published in 1993, revised in 1994 and reconfirmed in 2016 and 2021. ISO 12083 specifies four DTDs: Article, Book, Serial, and Math.

In 1995, concurrent with the withdrawal of ANSI/NISO Z39.59:1988, ANSI/ISO 12083 was adopted as U.S. standard ANSI/NISO/ISO 12083-1995 (R2009) Electronic Manuscript Preparation and Markup. This U.S. standard was withdrawn in 2016.

== Usage ==
ISO 12083 found its widest adoption among publishers of scientific journals. Rarely implemented in unmodified form, it became the basis of many DTDs in production use.

== Bibliography ==
- Kasdorf, William E. (2003). "Markup: XML & Related Technologies". In William E. Kasdorf (ed.). The Columbia Guide to Digital Publishing. New York: Columbia University Press. pp. 65–154. ISBN 978-0-231-12499-7.
