= Matt Welsh (computer scientist) =

American computer scientist

- Born: Matthew David Welsh
- Education: North Carolina School of Science and Mathematics
- Alma mater: Cornell University (BS); University of California, Berkeley (MS, PhD)
- Scientific career
- Fields: Systems; Networking; Mobile computing
- Institutions: Harvard University; Google; Apple; Palantir
- Thesis: An Architecture for Highly Concurrent, Well-Conditioned Internet Services (2002)
- Doctoral advisor: David Culler; Eric Brewer
- Website: www.mdw.la

Matthew David Welsh is a computer scientist and software engineer and is currently the Head of AI Systems at Palantir, which he started after stints at Aryn, Fixie.ai, Google, xnor.ai, OctoML, and Apple. He was the Gordon McKay Professor of Computer Science at Harvard University and author of several books about the Linux operating system, several Linux HOWTOs, the LinuxDoc format and articles in the Linux Journal.

== Education ==
Welsh is a 1992 graduate of the North Carolina School of Science and Mathematics.

Welsh received a Bachelor of Science degree from Cornell University in 1996 and Master of Science and PhD degrees from the University of California, Berkeley in 1999 and 2002, respectively. He spent the 1996–97 academic year at the University of Cambridge Computer Laboratory and at the University of Glasgow. His thesis was supervised by David Culler and Eric Brewer.

== Career and research ==
Welsh has led teams at Google and Apple Inc., and served a professor of Computer Science at Harvard University. In November 2010, five months after being granted tenure, Welsh announced that he was leaving Harvard.

=== The Social Network ===
Welsh taught the operating systems class at Harvard in which Mark Zuckerberg was a student. Welsh was later portrayed by actor Brian Palermo in the movie The Social Network featuring Zuckerberg and the founding of Facebook. Welsh was reportedly paid $200 for his Powerpoint slides used in the movie.

=== Publications ===
His publications include:

- Running Linux
- Linux Installation and Getting Started
- The End of Programming
