= HyTime =

Markup language

- Hypermedia/Time-based Structuring Language
- Abbreviation: HyTime
- Native name: Hypermedia/Time-based Structuring Language; ISO/IEC 10744:1997
- Status: Published
- Year started: 1984
- First published: November 1, 1992; 33 years ago
- Latest version: Edition 2; 1997
- Organization: ISO, IEC
- Committee: ISO/IEC JTC 1 (Edition 1); ISO/IEC JTC 1/SC 34 (Edition 2)
- Authors: Charles F. Goldfarb; Steven R. Newcomb
- Base standards: SGML
- Related standards: HTML; Topic Maps; XML; SGML; SMDL
- Domain: Information technology
- License: ISO Sales Agreement
- Website: www.iso.org/standard/29303.html

HyTime (Hypermedia/Time-based Structuring Language) is a markup language that is an application of SGML. HyTime defines a set of hypertext-oriented element types that, in effect, supplement SGML and allow SGML document authors to build hypertext and multimedia presentations in a standardized way.

HyTime is an international standard published by the ISO and IEC. The first edition was published in 1992, and the second edition was published in 1997.

== Legacy ==
Some of the concepts formalized in HyTime were later incorporated into HTML and XML:

- HTML is an application of SGML for hypertext document presentations, that assigns specific semantics and processing expectations to a fixed set of element types.
- XML defines a simplified subset of SGML that focuses on providing an open vocabulary of element types for data modeling and establishes precise expectations for how the marked-up data is read and subsequently fed to another software application for further processing, but does not assign semantics to the element types or establish expectations for how the data is processed.
- XLink was intended as a simplified version of HyTime for use in the XML world, but has not seen much adoption.
- Work on applying HyTime to back-of-book indexes eventually led to the development of Topic Maps, which eventually became far more successful in its own right than HyTime ever was.

== Standard ==
The HyTime standard itself is ISO/IEC 10744, first published in 1992 and available from the International Organization for Standardization. It was developed by ISO/IEC JTC 1/SC 34 (ISO/IEC Joint Technical Committee 1, Subcommittee 34 - Document description and processing languages).
