= LinuxDoc =

LinuxDoc is an SGML DTD which is similar to DocBook. Matt Welsh created it, and version 1.1 was announced in 1994. It is primarily used by the Linux Documentation Project. The DocBook SGML tags are often longer than the equivalent LinuxDoc tags.

LinuxDoc has a more succinct DTD than DocBook. Users of small to medium-size projects have found that it suits their purposes better than DocBook.

The Debian distribution of Linux has a Linuxdoc-tools package.

== See also ==
- Comparison of document-markup languages
- List of document markup languages
