= List of speech recognition software =

Speech recognition software is available for many computing platforms, operating systems, use models, and software licenses. Here is a listing of such, grouped in various useful ways.

== Acoustic models and speech corpus (compilation) ==
The following list presents notable speech recognition software engines with a brief synopsis of characteristics.

Application name	Description	Open-source	License	Operating system	Programming language	Supported language, note	Offline or online
CMU Sphinx	HMM	Yes	BSD style	Cross-platform	Java	English, German, French, Mandarin, Russian	Offline
HTK	HMM neural net	No	HTK specific	Cross-platform	C	English; version 3.5 released December 2015	
Julius	HMM trigrams	Yes	BSD style, non-commercial	Cross-platform	C	Japanese, English;	Offline
Kaldi	Neural net	Yes	Apache	Cross-platform	C++	English	
RWTH ASR	RWTH Aachen University	No	RWTH ASR, non-commercial use only	Linux, macOS	C++	English	
Whisper	Encoder/decoder transformer	Yes	MIT license	Cross-platform	Python (programming language)	Multilingual	Online (through API) and Offline

== Macintosh ==
Application name	Description	Open-source	License	Price	Note
Dragon for Mac (discontinued 2018)	macOS; by Nuance	No	Proprietary		
Dragon Dictate (discontinued)	macOS; by Nuance	No	Proprietary		
MacSpeech Scribe (discontinued)	Transcription from recorded text; acquired by Nuance				
iListen (discontinued)	PowerPC Macintosh; discontinued by MacSpeech; acquired by Nuance				
Speakable items	Included with macOS				
ViaVoice (discontinued)	IBM Product; acquired by Nuance				
Voice Navigator	Original GUI voice control; 1989				
Weesper Neon Flow	Voice-dictation software for macOS 11+; 100% offline processing; cross-app dictation	No	Proprietary	€5/month (free trial)	Provides local speech-to-text on device; available for macOS and Windows

== Cross-platform web apps based on Chrome ==
The following list presents notable speech recognition software that operate in a Chrome browser as web apps. They make use of HTML5 Web-Speech-API.

Application name	Description	Open-source	License	Price	Note
Speechmatics	Cloud based and on-premise automatic speech recognition	No	Proprietary	From £0.06 per minute of audio	

== Mobile devices and smartphones ==
Many mobile phone handsets, including feature phones and smartphones such as iPhones and BlackBerrys, have basic dial-by-voice features built in. Many third-party apps have implemented natural-language speech recognition support, including:

Application name	Description	Open-source	License	Price	Note
Assistant.ai	Assistant for Android, iOS and Windows Phone	No	Proprietary, freeware	Free	Discontinued
Dragon Dictation		No	Proprietary, freeware	Free	
Google Now	Android voice search	No	Proprietary, freeware	Free	
Google Voice Search		No	Proprietary, freeware	Free	
Microsoft Cortana	Microsoft voice search	No	Proprietary, freeware	Free	
Siri Personal Assistant	Apple's virtual personal assistant	No	Proprietary, freeware	Free	
Alexa – Amazon Echo	Amazon's personal assistant	No	Proprietary		
SILVIA	Android and iOS	No			
Vlingo					

== Windows ==
=== Windows built-in speech recognition ===
The Windows Speech Recognition version 8.0 by Microsoft comes built into Windows Vista, Windows 7, Windows 8 and Windows 10. Speech Recognition is available only in English, French, Spanish, German, Japanese, Simplified Chinese, and Traditional Chinese and only in the corresponding version of Windows; meaning you cannot use the speech recognition engine in one language if you use a version of Windows in another language. Windows 7 Ultimate and Windows 8 Pro allow you to change the system language, and therefore change which speech engine is available. Windows Speech Recognition evolved into Cortana (software), a personal assistant included in Windows 10.

=== Windows 7, 8, 10, 11 third-party speech recognition ===
- Braina – Dictate into third party software and websites, fill web forms and execute vocal commands.
- Dragon NaturallySpeaking from Nuance Communications – Successor to the older DragonDictate product. Focus on dictation. 64-bit Windows support since version 10.1.
- Tazti – Create speech command profiles to play PC games and control applications – programs. Create speech commands to open files, folders, webpages, applications. Windows 7, Windows 8 and Windows 8.1 versions.
- Voice Finger – software that improves the Windows speech recognition system by adding several extensions to it. The software enables controlling the mouse and the keyboard by only using the voice. It is especially useful for aiding users to overcome disabilities or to heal from computer injuries.

=== Microsoft Speech API ===
The first version of the Microsoft Speech API was released for Windows NT 3.51 and Windows 95 in 1995, it was then part of Windows up to Windows Vista. This initial version already contained Direct Speech Recognition and Direct Text To Speech APIs which applications could use to directly control engines, as well as simplified 'higher-level' Voice Command and Voice Talk APIs. Speech recognition functionality included as part of Microsoft Office and on Tablet PCs running Microsoft Windows XP Tablet PC Edition. It can also be downloaded as part of the Speech SDK 5.1 for Windows applications, but since that is aimed at developers building speech applications, the pure SDK form lacks any user interface (numerous applications were available), and thus is unsuitable for end users.

== Built-in software ==
- Microsoft Kinect includes built-in software which allows speech recognition of commands.
- Older generations of Nokia phones like Nokia N Series (before using Windows 7 mobile technology) used speech-recognition with family names from contact list and a few commands.
- Siri, originally implemented in the iPhone 4S, Apple's personal assistant for iOS, which uses technology from Nuance Communications.
- Cortana (software), Microsoft's personal assistant built into Windows Phone and Windows 10.

== Interactive voice response ==
The following are interactive voice response (IVR) systems:

- CSLU Toolkit
- Genesys
- HTK – copyrighted by Microsoft, but allows altering software for licensee's internal use
- LumenVox ASR
- Tellme Networks; acquired by Microsoft

== Unix-like x86 and x86-64 speech transcription software ==
- Janus Recognition Toolkit (JRTk)
- Mozilla DeepSpeech was developing an open-source Speech-To-Text engine based on Baidu's deep speech research paper.
- Weesper Neon Flow – professional voice-dictation software that provides offline speech-to-text processing on macOS and Windows using local AI models. It is not open source and offers a paid subscription after a 15‑day free trial.
- Vocalinux – open-source speech transcription software for Linux.

== Cross-platform speech transcription and dictation software ==
- Otter.ai – AI-powered transcription software for meetings and recorded speech.
- Wispr Flow – AI-powered voice dictation and speech-to-text software.
- Voxtype – open-source voice dictation software that converts speech to text in the focused application and supports local speech-recognition models.

== Discontinued software ==
- IBM VoiceType (formerly IBM Personal Dictation System)
- IBM ViaVoice – Embedded version still maintained by IBM. No longer supported for versions above Windows Vista. Untested above macOS 10.4 or on Macintoshes with an Intel chipset.
- Quack.com; acquired by AOL; the name has now been reused for an iPad search app.
- SpeechWorks from Nuance Communications.
- Yap Speech Cloud – Speech-to-text platform acquired by Amazon.com.

== See also ==
- Speech recognition software for Linux – Linux software for speech recognition
- Transcription software – Software that assists in the conversion of human speech into a text transcript
