= Speech recognition software for Linux =

Linux software for speech recognition

As of the early 2000s, several speech recognition (SR) software packages exist for Linux. Some of them are free and open-source software and others are proprietary software. Speech recognition usually refers to software that attempts to distinguish thousands of words in a human language. Voice control may refer to software used for communicating operational commands to a computer.

== Linux native speech recognition ==
=== History ===
In the late 1990s, a Linux version of ViaVoice, created by IBM, was made available to users for no charge. In 2002, the free software development kit (SDK) was removed by the developer.

=== Development status ===
In the early 2000s, there was a push to get a high-quality Linux native speech recognition engine developed. As a result, several projects dedicated to creating Linux speech recognition programs were begun, such as Mycroft, which is similar to Microsoft Cortana, but open-source. In 2022, Open-AI released the Whisper general-purpose speech recognition model as open-source under the MIT license.

==== Speech sample crowdsourcing ====
It is essential to compile a speech corpus to produce acoustic models for speech recognition projects. VoxForge is a free speech corpus and acoustic model repository that was built to collect transcribed speech to be used in speech recognition projects. VoxForge accepts crowdsourced speech samples and corrections of recognized speech sequences. It is licensed under a GNU General Public License (GPL).

=== Speech recognition concept ===
The first step is to begin recording an audio stream on a computer. The user has two main processing options:

- Discrete speech recognition (DSR) – processes information on a local machine entirely. This refers to self-contained systems in which all aspects of SR are performed entirely within the user's computer. This is becoming critical for protecting intellectual property (IP) and avoiding unwanted surveillance (2018).
- Remote or server-based SR – transmits an audio speech file to a remote server to convert the file into a text string file. Due to recent cloud storage schemes and data mining, this method more easily allows surveillance, theft of information, and inserting malware.

Remote recognition was formerly used by smartphones because they lacked sufficient performance, working memory, or storage to process speech recognition within the phone. These limits have largely been overcome although server-based SR on mobile devices remains universal.

==== Speech recognition in browser ====
Discrete speech recognition can be performed within a web browser and works well with supported browsers. Remote SR does not require installing software on a desktop computer or mobile device as it is mainly a server-based system with the inherent security issues noted above.

- Remote: The dictation service records an audio track of the user via a web browser.
- DSR: Some solutions work on a client only, without sending data to servers.

==== Free speech recognition engines ====
The following is a list of projects dedicated to implementing speech recognition in Linux, and major native solutions. These are not end-user applications. These are programming libraries that may be used to develop end-user applications.

- CMU Sphinx is a general term to describe a group of speech recognition systems developed at Carnegie Mellon University.
- HTK is the most famous and widely used speech recognition software before Kaldi.
- Julius is a high-performance, two-pass large vocabulary continuous speech recognition (LVCSR) decoder software for speech-related researchers and developers.
- Kaldi is a toolkit for speech recognition provided under the Apache licence.
- Mozilla DeepSpeech is developing an open-source Speech-To-Text engine based on Baidu's deep speech research paper.
- VoxForge is a free speech corpus and acoustic model repository for open-source speech recognition engines.

==== Proprietary speech recognition engines ====
- Janus Recognition Toolkit (JRTk) is a closed source speech recognition toolkit mainly targeted at Linux developed by the Interactive Systems Laboratories developed at Carnegie Mellon University and Karlsruhe Institute of Technology for which commercial and research licenses are available.

=== Recent Development ===
The newer systems use deep-learning, and are open-source tools for Linux. In September of 2022, OpenAI released a general purpose speech recognition model called Whisper, which can transcribe speech in multiple languages, translate speech into English and identify languages. It is licensed under the MIT License with its source code and model weights provided.

The whisper.cpp project offers a C and C++ version of Whisper inference, and is available for Linux (CPU and GPU). It can transcribe audio locally without having to utilize a cloud-based recognition service.

Another speech recognition toolkit is Vosk, which also has offline processing, streaming recognition, and multiple languages support. It's intended for use from the smallest devices to the servers and it offers bindings for application developers to any programming language..

== Voice control and keyboard shortcuts ==
Speech recognition usually refers to software that attempts to distinguish thousands of words in a human language. Voice control may refer to software used for sending operational commands to a computer or appliance. Voice control typically requires a much smaller vocabulary and thus is much easier to implement.

Simple software combined with keyboard shortcuts, have the earliest potential for practically accurate voice control in Linux.

== Running Windows speech recognition software with Linux ==
=== Via compatibility layer ===
It is possible to use programs such as Dragon NaturallySpeaking in Linux, by using Wine, though some problems may arise, depending on which version is used.

=== Via virtualized Windows ===
It is also possible to use Windows speech recognition software under Linux. Using no-cost virtualization software, it is possible to run Windows and NaturallySpeaking under Linux. VMware Server or VirtualBox support copy and paste to/from a virtual machine, making dictated text easily transferable to/from the virtual machine.

== See also ==
- List of speech recognition software
- Speech interface guideline – Guideline for designing interfaces operated by human voice
