= VoxForge =

VoxForge is a free speech corpus and acoustic model repository for open source speech recognition engines.

VoxForge was set up to collect transcribed speech to create a free GPL speech corpus in order to be uses with open source speech recognition engines. The speech audio files will be 'compiled' into acoustic models for use with open source speech recognition engines such as Julius, ISIP, and Sphinx and HTK (note: HTK has distribution restrictions).

VoxForge has used LibriVox as a source of audio data since 2007.

== See also ==
- Speech recognition in Linux
- List of speech recognition software

== Sources ==
- Deep learning for spoken language identification
- VOXFORGE.ORG FREE SPEECH CORPUS (Google translate)
- Tools for Collecting Speech Corpora via Mechanical-Turk
- An Integrated Approach to Robust Speech Recognition for a Command and Control Application on the Motorcycle
