= Whisper (speech recognition system) =

Machine learning model for speech

- Original author: OpenAI
- Release: September 21, 2022
Stable release
- Android: 9.58.0 / May 18, 2022; 4 years ago
- iOS: 9.0.0 / January 6, 2025; 21 months ago
- Written in: Python
- Type: Transcription software; Encoder-decoder transformer; Foundation model; Acoustic model
- License: MIT License
- Repository: github.com/openai/whisper

Whisper is a machine learning model for speech recognition and transcription, created by OpenAI and first released as open-source software in September 2022.

It is capable of transcribing speech in English and multiple other languages, and can translate several non-English languages into English. Whisper is a weakly-supervised deep learning acoustic model, made using an encoder-decoder transformer architecture. OpenAI claims that the combination of different training data and post-training filtering used in its development has led to improved recognition of accents, background noise, and jargon compared to previous approaches. While the model does not outperform larger, more specialized models and still experiences AI hallucination, it has been shown to be useful for general sound recognition and has many applications across different industries.

== Background ==
Speech recognition has had a long history in research; the first approaches made use of statistical methods, such as dynamic time warping, and later hidden Markov models. At around the 2010s, deep neural network approaches became more common for speech recognition models, which were enabled by the availability of large datasets ("big data") and increased computational performance. Early approaches to deep learning in speech recognition included convolutional neural networks, which were limited due to their inability to capture sequential data, which later led to developments of Seq2seq approaches, which include recurrent neural networks, which made use of long short-term memory.

Transformers, introduced in 2017 by Google, displaced many prior state-of-the-art approaches across a wide range in machine learning, and started becoming the core neural architecture in fields such as language modeling and computer vision. Weakly-supervised approaches to training acoustic models were recognized in the early 2020s as promising for speech recognition approaches using deep neural networks.

According to a NYT report, in 2021 OpenAI believed they exhausted sources of higher-quality data to train their large language models and decided to complement scraped web text with transcriptions of YouTube videos and podcasts, and developed Whisper to solve this task.

Whisper Large V2 was released on December 8, 2022, followed by Whisper Large V3 being released in November 2023, during the OpenAI Dev Day. In March 2025, OpenAI released new transcription models based on GPT-4o and GPT-4o mini, both of which have lower error rates than Whisper.

== Architecture ==
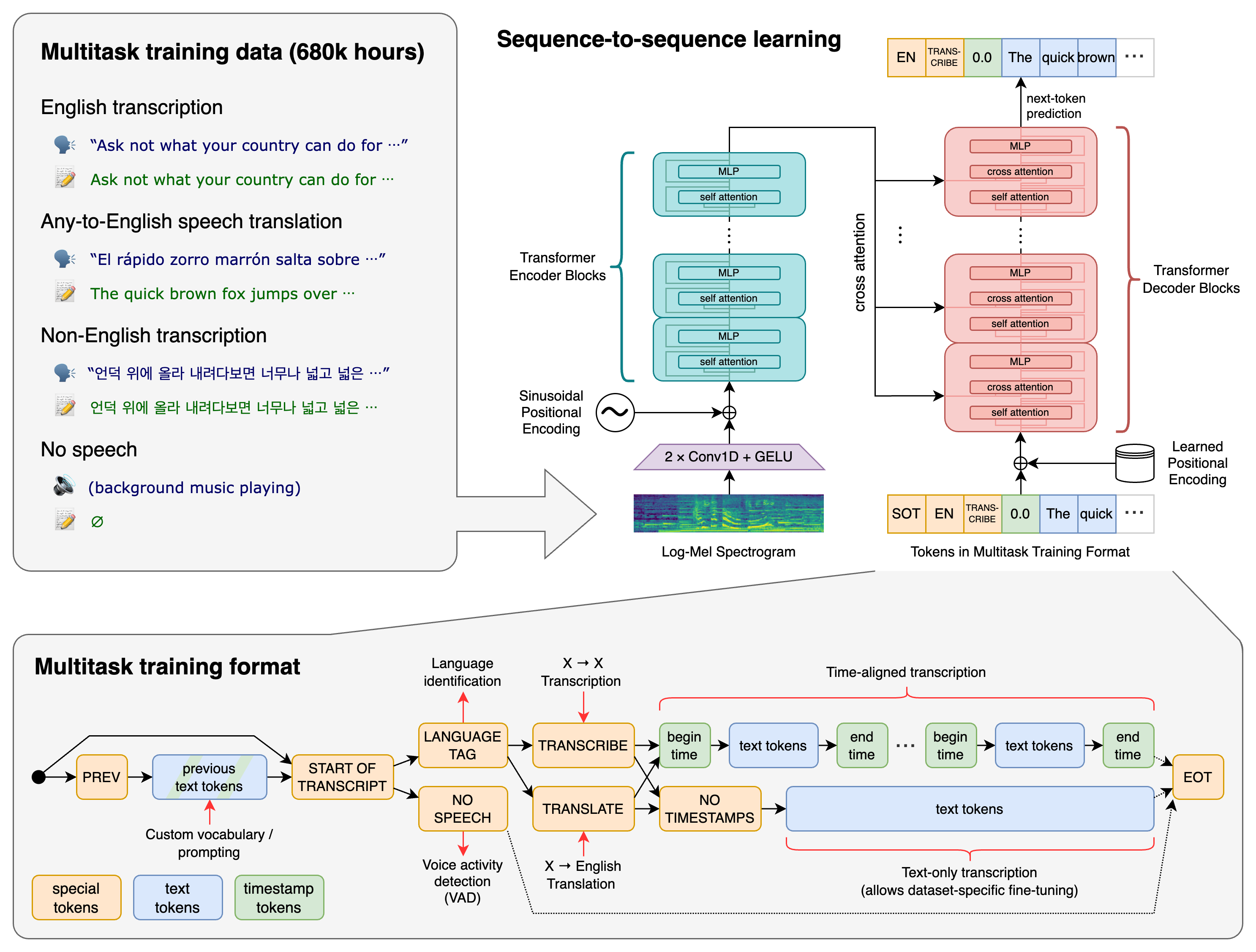
OpenAI Whisper architecture

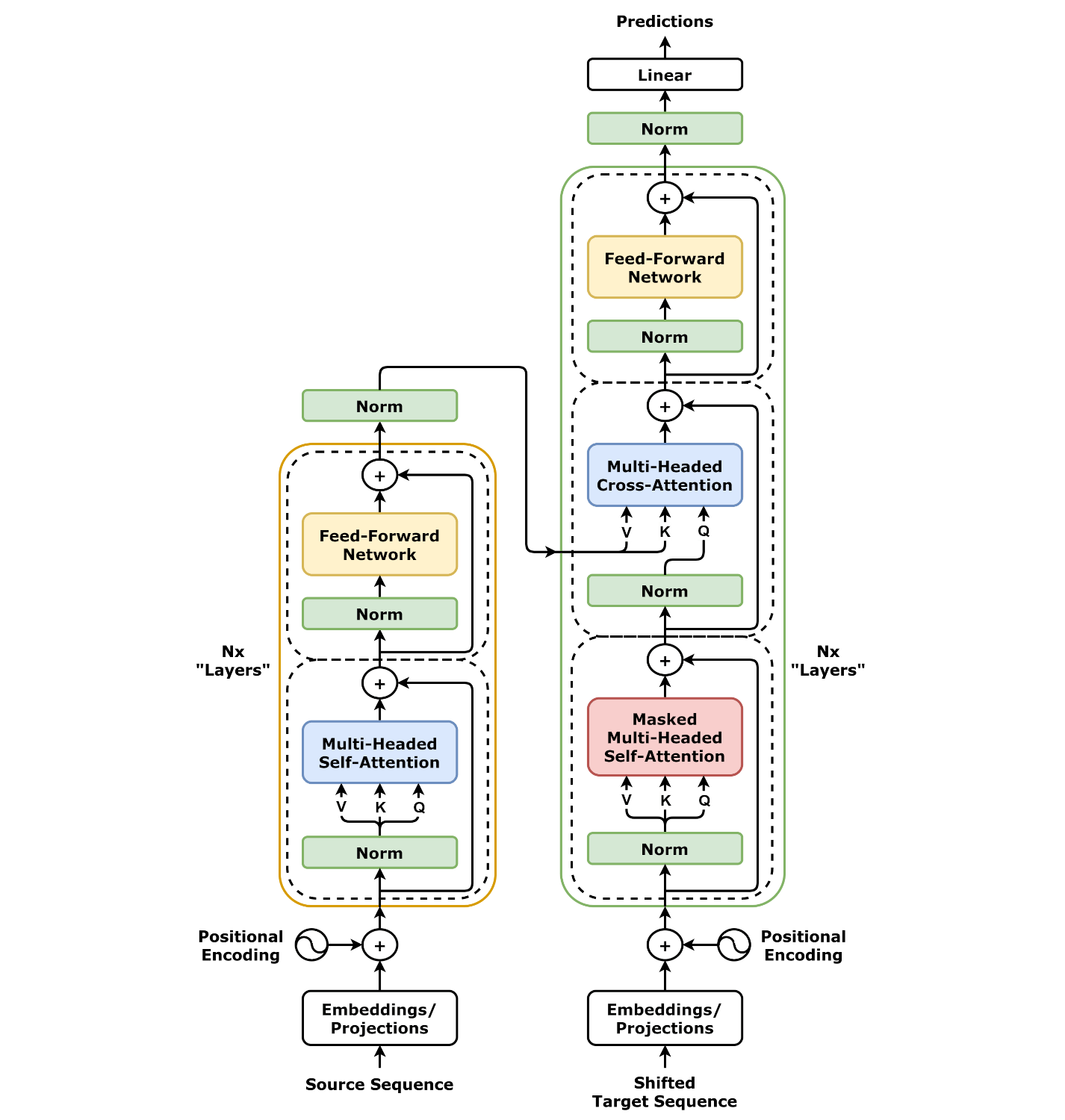
A standard transformer architecture, showing on the left an encoder, and on the right a decoder

The Whisper architecture is based on an encoder-decoder transformer.

Input audio is resampled to 16,000 Hertz (Hz) and converted to an 80-channel Log-magnitude Mel spectrogram using 25 ms windows with a 10 ms stride. The spectrogram is then normalized to a [-1, 1] range with near-zero mean.

The encoder takes this Mel spectrogram as input and processes it. It first passes through two convolutional layers. Sinusoidal positional embeddings are added. It is then processed by a series of Transformer encoder blocks (with pre-activation residual connections). The encoder's output is layer normalized.

The decoder is a standard transformer decoder. It has the same width and Transformer blocks as the encoder. It uses learned positional embeddings and tied input-output token representations (using the same weight matrix for both the input and output embeddings). It uses a byte-pair encoding tokenizer, of the same kind as used in GPT-2. English-only models use the GPT-2 vocabulary, while multilingual models employ a re-trained multilingual vocabulary with the same number of words.

Special tokens are used to allow the decoder to perform multiple tasks:

- Tokens that denote language (one unique token per language).
- Tokens that specify task (<|transcribe|> or <|translate|>).
- Tokens that specify if no timestamps are present (<|notimestamps|>). If the token is not present, then the decoder predicts timestamps relative to the segment, and quantized to 20 ms intervals.
- <|nospeech|> for voice activity detection.
- <|startoftranscript|>, and <|endoftranscript|> . Any text that appears before <|startoftranscript|> is not generated by the decoder, but given to the decoder as context. Loss is only computed over non-contextual parts of the sequence, i.e. tokens between these two special tokens.

== Training data ==
The training dataset consists of 680,000 hours of labeled audio-transcript pairs sourced from the internet using semi-supervised learning. This includes 117,000 hours in 96 non-English languages and 125,000 hours of X→English translation data, where X stands for any non-English language.

Preprocessing involved standardization of transcripts, filtering to remove machine-generated transcripts using heuristics (e.g., punctuation, capitalization), language identification and matching with transcripts, fuzzy deduplication, and deduplication with evaluation datasets to avoid data contamination. Speechless segments were also included to allow voice activity detection training. For the files still remaining after the filtering process, audio files were then broken into 30-second segments paired with the subset of the transcript that occurs within that time. If this predicted spoken language differed from the language of the text transcript associated with the audio, that audio-transcript pair was not used for training the speech recognition models, but instead for training translation.

The model was trained using the AdamW optimizer with gradient norm clipping and a linear learning rate decay with warmup, with batch size 256 segments. Training proceeded for 1 million updates (approximately 2-3 epochs). No data augmentation or regularization, except for the Large V2 model, which used SpecAugment, Stochastic Depth, and BPE Dropout. The training used data parallelism with float16, dynamic loss scaling, and activation checkpointing.

=== Post-training filtering ===
After training the first model, researchers ran it on different subsets of the training data, each representing a distinct source. Data sources were ranked by a combination of their error rate and size. Manual inspection of the top-ranked sources (high error, large size) helped determine if the source was low quality (e.g., partial transcriptions, inaccurate alignment). After training, it was fine-tuned to suppress the prediction of speaker names and low-quality sources were then removed.

== Capacity ==
While Whisper does not outperform models which specialize in the LibriSpeech dataset, when tested across many datasets, it is more robust and makes 55.2% fewer errors than other models. Whisper has a differing error rate with respect to transcribing different languages, with a higher word error rate in languages not well-represented in the training data. The authors found that multi-task learning improved overall performance compared to models specialized to one task. They conjectured that the best Whisper model trained is still underfitting the dataset, and larger models and longer training can result in better models.

Third-party evaluations have found varying levels of AI hallucination. A study of transcripts of public meetings found hallucinations in eight out of every 10 transcripts, while an engineer discovered hallucinations in "about half" of 100 hours of transcriptions and a developer identified them in "nearly every one" of 26,000 transcripts. A study of 13,140 short audio segments (averaging 10 seconds) found 187 hallucinations (1.4%), 38% of which generated text that could be harmful because it inserted false references to things like race, non-existent medications, or violent events that were not in the audio.

== Applications ==
The model has been used as the base for many applications, such as a unified model for speech recognition and more general sound recognition. Whisper has also been integrated into the workflow of biomedical research. In 2025, a study on Alzheimer's disease detection used the model to transcribe spontaneous speech recordings. The transcripts that were generated by the model were combined with LLM vector embeddings and traditional classifiers to help classify the patients' health. Another application is when OVALYTICS incorporated Whisper to transcribe YouTube videos and automate content moderation systems, which improved its detection of offensive content.

The model has also been used in academic libraries and cultural heritage institutions to generate transcripts and captions for their digitized audiovisual collections. In a 2025 case study, Emory University Libraries found that Whisper reduced the labor used in transcription by around 30-35%, shifting work from text creation to text correction. However, human review is still necessary to make sure accuracy, formatting, and accessibility are all standard.

== See also ==
- Transcription software
- List of speech recognition software
- Speech recognition software for Linux
- AI boom
- Neural machine translation
