= IListen =

iListen, developed by MacSpeech, is a speech recognition program for the Apple Macintosh. In 2006, iListen was the only third-party software that allowed inputting text using one's voice that works on newer Macintosh models. Its competitors were Apple's own speech recognition software (built into Mac OS X); Dragon Naturally Speaking by Nuance, running under Windows virtualization software such as Parallels Desktop for Mac or VMware Fusion; and the discontinued speech recognition program ViaVoice by Nuance/IBM.

In January 2008, iListen was discontinued by MacSpeech, and was replaced by its new speech recognition program, "Dictate" (released February 15, 2008). "Dictate" uses the same speech-recognition engine as Dragon NaturallySpeaking, having licensed it from Nuance. iListen's speech recognition engine was based on software developed by Philips.

== See also ==
- MacSpeech_Dictate
- MacSpeech
- List of commercial speech recognition programs
