= RASR =

RASR may refer to:

- Reliability, availability, scalability and recoverability of a database
- Renã A. S. Robinson, American chemistry professor, principal investigator of the RASR Laboratory at the Vanderbilt University
- RWTH ASR, a proprietary speech recognition toolkit
