= World Communication Awards =

Award established to recognize excellence amongst global telecom operators

The World Communication Awards (WCA) were established in 1999 to recognise excellence amongst global telecom operators. The first awards were presented in Geneva during ITU Telecom '99 and were held at the Espace Sécheron More recent awards have been presented in London drawing an audience of around 500 senior executives from the telecommunications industry.

Over the years, the World Communication Awards have evolved from being purely for telecom operators to encompass the broader telecom and ICT industry, with categories applicable to telecom operators and service providers, as well as vendors. In 2011 a sister event, the Asia Communication Awards was launched and is held annually in Singapore.

The World Communication Awards are organised by Total Telecom and their owners Terrapinn. It celebrated its 10th year in 2008 with fifteen categories being presented, and with the chairman of the judges being David Molony, former editor-in-chief of Total Telecom and now an analyst at consultants Ovum.

Over the years the WCA have become more wide-ranging and international, with the 2007 winners including Bharti Airtel, Minick, BT, NTT Comm, SpinVox, Afsat, Orange, ip.access, Botswana Telecom, TeliaSonera, and Viviane Reding.

== See also ==
- IEEE Alexander Graham Bell Medal, an award for scientific and engineering achievements in telecommunications
