= MacSpeech =

Speech recognition etc. software company

MacSpeech, Inc.
- Industry: Speech recognition and voice dictation software
- Founded: March 7, 1997
- Successor: Nuance Communications, Inc.
- Headquarters: Salem, New Hampshire
- Products: iListen; MacSpeech Dictate; MacSpeech Scribe

MacSpeech, Inc. was a New Hampshire-based technology company that produced software-based speech recognition and voice dictation solutions for the Apple ecosystem. The company's products included iListen, MacSpeech Dictate, MacSpeech Dictate Medical, MacSpeech Dictate Legal, MacSpeech Dictate International, and MacSpeech Scribe. On February 12, 2010, Nuance Communications, Inc. acquired MacSpeech.

== History ==
The first commercial voice dictation product for Mac OS X was IBM's ViaVoice, but ScanSoft, the company that had exclusive global distribution rights to ViaVoice, merged with Nuance and stopped developing ViaVoice for Macintosh. (The first dictation software for Mac OS 9 was Articulate System's PowerSecretary.) Seeing a continued need for a Mac-based speech-to-text solution, MacSpeech was founded in 1996 by Andrew Taylor, a former employee of Articulate Systems experienced with software-based speech recognition technologies.

=== iListen ===
MacSpeech's first product, iListen, was developed in partnership with Philips Speech Processing using its "FreeSpeech 2000" speech engine. First released in 2000, by 2006 iListen was the only third-party software product that allowed voice-to-text input on the newer MacIntosh models requiring OSX. Its competitors at the time were Apple's own speech recognition software (built into Mac OS X); Dragon Naturally Speaking for PC by Nuance, running under a Windows virtualization software solution such as Parallels Desktop for Mac or VMware Fusion; and the discontinued program ViaVoice by Nuance/IBM.

=== MacSpeech Dictate ===
In January 2008, iListen was discontinued, and replaced by "MacSpeech Dictate" (released February 15, 2008). The firm abandoned the Philips speech engine in favor of the speech-recognition engine Nuance used in its Dragon NaturallySpeaking product for PC. MacSpeech Dictate was a winner of the MacWorld 2008 Best of Show award. In 2009, the firm released several editions of its products for the MacIntosh, including MacSpeech Dictate Medical, MacSpeech Dictate Legal and MacSpeech Dictate International.

MacSpeech Dictate ran as a Mac-native application. It used the Dragon speech recognition engine (v9 or v10), licensed from Nuance Communications. This is the same technology that powers speech recognition in Dragon NaturallySpeaking for the PC, although across platforms there are significant differences in features, functionality and integration. One major difference with MacSpeech Dictate was that it did not allow training by typing misrecognized words as Dragon NaturallySpeaking products do on Windows. Another notable difference was the lack of a transcription feature for recorded voice dictation, as found in NaturallySpeaking. MacSpeech released a separate product, MacSpeech Scribe, to handle this.

MacSpeech Dictate Medical, a version with specialized vocabularies for doctors and dentists, was released in June 2009. MacSpeech Dictate Legal, with specialized vocabulary for lawyers, was released in July 2009. MacSpeech Dictate International, with support for speech recognition in English, French, German and Italian, was released in September 2009. Localized versions of MacSpeech Dictate are available in German, French and Italian. It has never been available in Spanish.

The original release used Dragon's v9 speech recognition engine. Version 1.5 was released in May 2009, and gained Microsoft Word integration, vocabulary editing features, and the Dragon v10 engine. Version 2.0 was released in September 2010, after the Dragon acquisition, and was renamed Dragon Dictate for Mac. Version 2 had the Dragon v11 engine, new voice commands for text editing, and a text-to-speech proofreading feature.

MacSpeech Dictate 1.0 was reviewed by David Pogue of The New York Times, who said it filled a "big [hole] in the Macintosh landscape", but criticized it as inferior to Dragon NaturallySpeaking 9.0 for Windows.

=== MacSpeech Scribe ===
MacSpeech Scribe is speech recognition software for Mac OS X designed specifically for transcription of recorded voice dictation. It runs on Mac OS X 10.6 Snow Leopard. The software transcribes dictation recorded by an individual speaker. Typically the speaker will have recorded their dictation using a digital recording device such as a handheld digital recorder, mobile smartphone (e.g. iPhone), or desktop or laptop computer with a suitable microphone. The program supports the audio file formats aif, .aiff, .wav, .mp4, .m4a, and .m4v.

== Acquisition by Nuance ==
On February 12, 2010, MacSpeech, Inc. was acquired by Nuance Communications, Inc., and MacSpeech's products were incorporated into Nuance's Dragon NaturalSpeaking product line.

== See also ==
- List of speech recognition software
