= Shorten (codec) =

Lossless audio codec

- Developer(s): Tony Robinson
- Initial release: March 30, 1993; 32 years ago
- Stable release: 3.6.1 / 2007-03-19 (final)
- Operating system: Cross-platform
- Type: Audio codec Data compression
- License: Shorten software license
- Website: etree.org/shnutils/shorten/

Shorten
- Filename extension: .shn
- Internet media type: application/x-shorten
- Developed by: Tony Robinson
- Type of format: Audio

Shorten (SHN) is a file format used for compressing audio data. It is a form of data compression of files and is used to losslessly compress CD-quality audio files (44.1 kHz 16-bit stereo PCM). Shorten is no longer developed and other lossless audio codecs such as FLAC, Monkey's Audio (APE), TTA, and WavPack (WV) have become more popular. It is still in use to trade concert recordings that are already encoded as Shorten files. Shorten files use the .shn file extension.

== Handling Shorten files ==
All libavcodec based players and converters support decoding the Shorten format; and since the LAVFilters are based on libavcodec, support can easily be added to Windows Media Player and other software that uses the standard filter / codec APIs. As far as less common programs, some Rockbox applications can play Shorten files without decompression, and third-party Shorten plug-ins exist for Nero Burning ROM, Foobar2000, and Winamp. VLC media player supports Shorten files natively, and ffplay from the ffmpeg package can be used if a command line utility is desired.

== See also ==
- FLAC
- MPEG-4 ALS
- Meridian Lossless Packing
- Monkey's Audio (APE)
- WavPack
