= DragonDictate =

Speech recognition software

DragonDictate, Dragon Dictate, or Dragon for Mac was proprietary speech recognition software. In 2021 its owner, Nuance Communications, was acquired by Microsoft and it has since been incorporated into Microsoft Copilot as Dragon Copilot.

It was originally developed by Dragon Systems for Microsoft Windows, and was replaced by Dragon NaturallySpeaking for Windows. It was later acquired by Nuance Communications. Dragon Dictate for Mac 2.0 (originally named MacSpeech Dictate) is supported only on Mac OS X 10.6 (Snow Leopard). Nuance's other products for Mac included MacSpeech Scribe.

== Original DragonDictate ==
DragonDictate for Windows was the original speech recognition application from Dragon Systems and used discrete speech where the user must pause between speaking each word. The first version, 1.0 was available only through a few distribution and support partners. It included a Shure cardioid microphone headset. Later it was replaced by Dragon NaturallySpeaking, which allows continuous speech recognition and correction and training of words via the keyboard. NaturallySpeaking remains a Windows-only program, and since 2016 distributes in Version 15. DragonDictate for Windows is still available but has not been updated since Windows 98 was the current operating system.

== Dragon Dictate for Mac ==
Dragon Dictate for Mac 2.0, an upgrade for MacSpeech Dictate, was announced on September 20, 2010, by Nuance Communications, the developer of MacSpeech products. The upgrade incorporates some of the features of NaturallySpeaking into the MacSpeech software. Dragon Dictate for Mac lacks other NaturallySpeaking features, such as training mis-recognized words by simply re-typing them using the keyboard. An early review by David Pogue notes,

I’m thrilled about the power, the control, the speed and the accuracy of Dragon Dictate. It does, however, have some room for improvement.

For example, in the dictation software world, teaching the software to know its location in your text document is a huge challenge. If you never touch the mouse, the program always knows where it is in the text—because it has deposited all that text itself.

But if you click to edit somewhere, it's blind. It no longer knows where it is in the document.

In Windows, Nuance has used some clever tricks to overcome this problem in the most important programs, like Word and Outlook. On the Mac, however, the program has no idea what you’ve done manually, by clicking. So you can say something like "select fishmonger," and the program correctly selects that word. But if you then say "italicize that" or "capitalize that," the program operates on the wrong words, italicizing or capping something a mile away from the selection. Bizarre.

(This problem doesn't happen in TextEdit or Dictate's own included word processor.)

In October 2018 Nuance announced that it was dropping Macintosh support for its products.

== See also ==
- List of speech recognition software

== Notable users ==
- Peter David – American writer of comic books, novels, television, movies and video games. David began using DragonDictate following his stroke in December 2012.
