= Yap (company) =

Yap Inc.
- Website type: Subsidiary
- Founded: 2006
- Headquarters: Charlotte, North Carolina, United States
- Founders: Igor R. Jablokov, Victor R. Jablokov
- Chairperson: Timothy G. Biltz
- CEO: Igor R. Jablokov
- Industry: Telecommunication
- Products: Speech recognition
- Total equity: US$12 million
- Parent: Amazon
- Website: yapme.com

Yap Speech Cloud was a multimodal speech recognition system developed by American technology company Yap Inc. It offered a fully cloud-based speech-to-text transcription platform that was used by customers such as Microsoft.

The Company was a contestant at the inaugural TechCrunch conference and was subsequently acquired by Amazon in September 2011 to help develop products such as Alexa Voice Service, Echo, and Fire TV.

== See also ==
- List of speech recognition software
