= Transcription of Russian =

The transcription of the spoken Russian language is usually done in the Cyrillic script.

This literal Russian is taken as base for transcription and transliteration into different scripts, most prominently the roman.
