= TOZO =

American electronic products' company

TOZO is an American consumer electronics company based in Seattle, Washington. Established in June 2015 by Ryel Lin, the company focuses on designing and manufacturing smart devices and digital accessories that utilize Bluetooth technology. TOZO's products include headphones, Wireless earbuds, smartwatches, speakers, power banks, chargers, and 360 action cameras.

== History ==
After TOZO's establishment, it introduced its first True Wireless Stereo Bluetooth T8 earbuds in March 2017. In July 2018, the company launched the TOZO W1 wireless charger, followed by the release of its first IPX8 waterproof wireless Bluetooth T10 earbuds in October 2018.

In May 2019, the TOZO T6 earbuds gained popularity on the Amazon platform in North America, becoming the highest-ranking product in its category. The T6 also received multiple product design patents that year. By December 2019, sales of the T6 surpassed one million units.

In January 2020, TOZO released its first noise-canceling earbuds, the NC9, which became one of the top-selling products on Amazon. In March 2020, TOZO released the TOZO NC7 active noise-canceling earbuds, which feature optical in-ear detection. By May 2020, the TOZO brand had expanded to 50 countries and regions worldwide, offering products with an audio focus. In September 2020, TOZO introduced the S1 smartwatch and its companion mobile application, TOZO Fit. In October 2020, the independently developed noise reduction earbuds, NC2, were granted multiple patents for their features.

In July 2021, the first wireless gaming earbuds, TOZO G1, were launched, offering both music and gaming modes with low latency. In September 2021, the TOZO T9 TWS earbuds were introduced, featuring environmental noise cancellation (ENC). In September 2022, the TOZO A3 stem-style semi-in-ear earbuds were released.

In April 2023, TOZO launched X-series earbuds, the TOZO Golden X1, which features a dual-driver setup, LDAC high-definition audio codec support, and noise cancellation. The TOZO Golden X1 also received several design awards for its features and design. TOZO T10 was recognized as one of the "Most Popular Prime Day Deals" on Forbes Vetted. TOZO Crystal Buds won the Gold Award at the 2023 MUSE Design Awards and the Silver Award at the 2022 IDA International Design Awards.

TOZO Golden X1 received the Silver Award at the 2023 MUSE Design Awards and an Honorable Mention at the 2022 IDA International Design Awards.

By 2024, TOZO sold over 20 million units globally. In 2025, it introduced the Golden X2 Pro, a flagship wireless earbud model featuring a dual-driver acoustic system and AI functionalities. The Golden X2 Pro incorporates 12mm dynamic drivers alongside Knowles balanced armature drivers, supporting LDAC codec compatibility and holding Hi-Res Wireless Audio certification and ORIGX Pro acoustic certification. It also integrates AI-based features, including real-time translation during conversations, speech transcription, and meeting note generation. That same year, TOZO also unveiled Open Ultra and Crystal Pods headphones. TOZO Golden X2 Pro received the CES Innovation Awards 2025. Also in 2025, TOZO's Open Ultra, Crystal Pods and Golden X2 Pro headphones became Gold Winners of the MUSE Design Awards in the Product Design – Music, Audio & Sound category.

== Products ==
TOZO's products include wireless earbuds, over-ear headphones, portable speakers, smartwatches, and chargers. The company has 30 million users globally and more than 1.5 million positive reviews. TOZO's products are available on e-commerce platforms, including Amazon, eBay, Walmart, and AliExpress. The company has also partnered with retail stores in countries including Australia, India, Europe, the United States, and Japan.
