= CSRC (disambiguation) =

CSRC is the China Securities Regulatory Commission.

CSRC may also refer to:

- Computer Security Resource Center, a National Institute of Standards and Technology division
- Conflict Studies Research Centre, a former college of the Defence Academy of the United Kingdom
- Continuous Speech Recognition Consortium, Japan, one of the developers of Julius Speech Recognition Engine
- Computational Science Research Center, a part of the College of Sciences at San Diego State University
- Computing Science Research Center, at Bell Labs, originator of Plan 9 from Bell Labs
- China Synthetic Rubber Corp., now named as International CSRC Investment Holdings Co., Ltd. The biggest carbon black producer in Taiwan.
- Creation Science Research Center
- Czech Space Research Centre
