= MacSpeech Scribe =

Speech recognition software

MacSpeech Scribe is speech recognition software for Mac OS X designed specifically for transcription of recorded voice dictation. It runs on Mac OS X 10.6 Snow Leopard. The software transcribes dictation recorded by an individual speaker. Typically, the speaker will record their dictation using a digital recording device such as a handheld digital recorder, mobile smartphone (e.g. iPhone), or desktop or laptop computer with a suitable microphone. MacSpeech Scribe supports specific audio file formats for recorded dictation: .aif, .aiff, .wav, .mp4, .m4a, and .m4v.

MacSpeech Scribe was originally developed by MacSpeech, Inc. and released February 11, 2010, at Macworld Expo in San Francisco. The product is now owned by Nuance Communications which acquired MacSpeech on February 16, 2010. Nuance is the developer of other speech recognition products including Dragon NaturallySpeaking for Windows, Dragon Dictate for Mac (formerly "MacSpeech Dictate"), and Dragon Dictation apps for iOS.

Jeffery Battersby of Macworld noted in his September 2010 review of MacSpeech Scribe, v1.1:

Small foibles aside, MacSpeech Scribe is a powerful and intelligent tool for transcribing your recorded speech. A simple training process and access to a wide variety of standard audio formats mean that you’ll be moving your spoken text to the printed page in a matter of minutes and with a minimum of hassle. Scribe is the best, simplest way for you to get your spoken word to the printed page.

== Release history ==
Version	Release date	Changes
1.0	February 2010	Initial Release.
1.0.1	June 2010	Minor bug fixes.
1.1	September 2010	Minor bug fixes, interface enhancements, volume licensing support.
