= Otter.ai =

Transcription software company

Otter.ai, Inc.
- Type: Private
- Industry: Transcription software
- Predecessor: AISense
- Founded: 2016; 10 years ago
- Founders: Sam Liang, Yun Fu
- Headquarters: Mountain View, California, United States
- Key people: Sam Liang, CEO
- Products: Otter transcription software for meeting notes
- Website: otter.ai

Otter.ai, Inc. is an American transcription software company based in Mountain View, California. The company develops speech to text transcription applications using artificial intelligence and machine learning. Its software, called Otter, shows captions for live speakers, and generates written transcriptions of speech.

While Otter's software has been praised for its functionality, it is also the subject of privacy concerns, including allegations that the company records users' conversations without consent.

== History ==
Otter.ai was founded as AISense in 2016 by Sam Liang and Yun Fu, two computer science engineers with a long history of working with artificial intelligence.

In January 2018, the company announced a partnership with Zoom Video Communications to transcribe video meetings post-conference. In March, the company debuted its first Otter speech translation app at Mobile World Congress. It was available for free for Google's Android and Apple's mobile products. In October, the company launched Otter for Education, a note taking tool designed for college students.

In March 2019, the company launched Otter for Teams, a transcription and storage product for enterprises.

In January 2020, now doing business as Otter.ai, the company announced another US$10M funding round, led by Japanese mobile phone operator NTT Docomo's Docomo Ventures. In April, the company announced it was offering Live Notes for Zoom calls.

== Technology ==
To develop its speech transcription technology, the company says it combined deep machine learning using millions of hours of audio recordings, which were analyzed to train the software and improve the transcription capabilities. The company says that it uses proprietary algorithms to scour the web for these usable audio segments.

=== OtterPilot ===
In February 2023, Otter.ai launched an AI meeting assistant called OtterPilot, available to all users, which automates meetings, with an AI-generated summary of key meeting topics, automated capture of images of slides shared during virtual meetings, and real-time meeting notes that can be shared and collaborated on. OtterPilot includes Otter Assistant, which can automatically join meetings on a user's calendar and transcribe conversations.

== Privacy and security ==
Otter has been banned by the University of Massachusetts on the basis that the software violates Massachusetts' requirement for all-party consent to record a conversation. Users have also complained that Otter has joined meetings unasked when linked to a calendar application.

In March 2018, technology news site ZDNet reported issues with Otter.ai's privacy policy, noting that the company could access uploaded recordings and transcriptions. In response, Otter.ai updated its policy and stated that only the company's chief technology officer would allow access to transcriptions, and only in response to a "legitimate user request". In 2022, Politico highlighted further concerns about the privacy practices of Otter.ai after the company queried journalist Phelim Kine about the purpose of a meeting transcribed through Otter.ai, which involved a discussion with Mustafa Aksu, a Uyghur human rights advocate. Kine reported receiving an unusual survey from Otter.ai referencing the interview's title, leading to fears of potential surveillance or data leaks. Although Otter.ai confirmed the legitimacy of the survey, they later retracted that statement and advised Kine to ignore it.

A 2025 class-action lawsuit (N.D. Cal., No. 5:25-cv-06911) filed in California alleges that Otter.ai records users' conversations without their permission, to use as AI training data. The key claims are, respectively: ECPA, CIPA, CFAA ("OtterPilot joined Zoom without participant knowledge; data used for AI training"); Illinois BIPA ("Voiceprints collected to identify speakers without written consent"); ECPA, CIPA ("Auto-join enabled by default; continues joining after users disable it), and ECPA, BIPA, CIPA ("Default config does not notify non-users; notification only in Enterprise plan"). Additional AI recording lawsuits include Cruz v. Fireflies.AI (Illinois BIPA, Dec. 2025), Galanter v. Cresta (CIPA, June 2025), and Lisota v. Heartland Dental (federal wiretap, July 2025).

== Reception ==
Digital media website Mashable and technology publication Fast Company named Otter one of the best apps of 2018.

== See also ==
- DeepL
- LanguageTool
- vidby
