= Speakable items =

Computer speech recognition feature

Speakable items is part of the speech recognition feature in the classic Mac OS and macOS operating systems. It allows the user to control their computer with natural speech, without having to train the computer beforehand. The commands must be present in the Speakable items folder though but can be created with something as simple as a shortcut, AppleScript, keyboard command, or Automator workflows.

== History ==
Speakable items was first introduced as part of Apple's speech recognition software PlainTalk in 1993. Originally available only on Quadra AV models, it was later integrated with the System 7.1.2 release of the Macintosh system software.

With the release of Mac OS X v10.4 it was featured as #12 on their list of features. In OS X Mountain Lion, Speakable Items has been relocated to the Accessibility panel in System Preferences.

== Automation ==
Mac OS X v10.4 added Automator workflows which can also be used as Speakable items.

If a workflow is saved as an application and put in the Speakable items folder it becomes available to the speech recognition software. The words the computer will recognize to execute the command will be the name of the saved Automator application. Some words might have to be misspelt for the computer to know the proper pronunciation. (For example, the computer best recognizes "Les Misérables" as Lay Mizzer Ob).

Because Automator is made to comply with AppleScript applications only, most third party or non AppleScript applications, such as Limewire or Final Cut Studio apps will not work with speakable items, unless you configure commands only with "define a keyboard command": in which you'll just select "this application only" after making a keyboard command.

== Problems ==
While Speakable Items is useful, as well as innovative, recognition gets hard and distorted some times.

1. In Macs without dual beamforming microphones (pre-2012), background noise interferes with recognition, and limits the usefulness of the "listening continuously" option.
2. Sometimes the pronunciation the computer understands varies from the proper pronunciation. This usually happens with custom commands.
3. The Speakable items folder also has the abilities to open applications that are blocked by Parental Controls without an administrators permission. This is achieved by copying and application and placing within the folder and opening it from there. However this does not bypass applications from an unidentified developer, if the Applications Downloaded From: App Store or App Store and Identified Developers setting is checked.

== See also ==
- Speech recognition
- List of speech recognition software
