= 4Paradigm =

Chinese AI company

Phancy Group Co., Ltd.
- Trade name: 4Paradigm
- Native name: 北京第四范式智能技术股份有限公司
- Type: Public
- Traded as: SEHK: 6682
- Industry: Artificial intelligence
- Founded: 17 September 2014; 11 years ago
- Founders: Dai Wenyuan; Yang Qiang
- Headquarters: Beijing, China
- Key people: Dai Wenyuan (Chairman & CEO)
- Revenue: ▲CN¥4.20 billion (2023)
- Net income: ▲CN¥−9.21 million (2023)
- Total assets: ▲CN¥7.15 billion (2023)
- Total equity: ▲CN¥5.45 billion (2023)
- Number of employees: 1,801 (2023)
- Website: www.4paradigm.com

Phancy Group Co., Ltd. doing business as 4Paradigm (Chinese: 第四范式; pinyin: Dìsì Fànshì) is a Chinese company publicly listed in Hong Kong that focuses on providing artificial intelligence (AI) tools and applications in China.

== Background ==
4Paradigm was founded in 2014 by several former employees of Huawei's AI division. Dai Wenyuan who was one of the main co-founders and the current CEO was featured in the Innovators Under 35 list from MIT Technology Review. He was part of Shanghai Jiao Tong University's team that won the International Collegiate Programming Contest world championship in 2005 and as of 2017 had the third most cited paper in the field of transfer learning.

According to Dai, 4Paradigm was founded to eliminate the technical barrier for those looking to apply AI technology. It provides its clients a suite of software tools that let them run complex algorithms without needing to rely on specialists. For example, it provides tools for banks to perform analysis such as identifying customers and detecting fraud. It also has made its owns chips that could process its algorithms which are offered as part of its packages to clients.

Investors of 4Paradigm include Goldmans Sachs, Sequoia Capital, Sinovation Ventures, Cisco and Lenovo. Later investors included Chinese banks that were significant clients of 4Paradigm.

From 2015 to 2017, 4Paradigm expanded into Chinese banking sector with more than half of the top 20 banks adopting its tools. It benefited from the Chinese government's deleveraging campaign as well as growing popularity of online payments by companies such as Alibaba and Tencent.

4Paradigm tools has also been used in the medial and antique industries. In September 2018, 4Paradigm and Ruijin Hospital developed a tool named Ruining Zhitang which could assess the risk of diabetes in real time.

By December 2018, 4Paradigm had reached a valuation over US$1 billion and acquired unicorn status.

In April 2023, 4Paradigm announced it had launched Shishuo, an enterprise level product that follows ChatGPT.

4Paradigm had applied for an initial public offering (IPO) in Hong Kong but had failed three times before. One of the major concerns was US Sanctions. On 28 September 2023, 4Paradigm completed its IPO and became a publicly listed company on the Hong Kong Stock Exchange. It raised HKD 1.02 billion (US$130 million).

== US Sanctions ==
On 16 December 2021, 4Paradigm was profiled by The Washington Post as an entity of concern by the Biden Administration. The Center for Security and Emerging Technology of Georgetown University stated in its report that 4Paradigm did not publicly announce it had a contract with the People's Liberation Army (PLA) Armored Forces Academy. The contract appeared on a PLA procurement database which was publicly accessible until 2021. The contact was for "battalion command decision-making and human-machine teaming software". There were concerns that US investors were funding companies that had Chinese military or surveillance ties. 4Paradigm stated in response that its products are "designed and intended only for civilian uses" and it didn't have a license for military provisions.

In March 2023, 4Paradigm was added to the Bureau of Industry and Security Entity List.
