= Janet M. Baker =

American speech recognition researcher

- Education: Tufts University; Carnegie Mellon University
- Known for: Dragon Systems
- Spouse: James K. Baker
- Scientific career
- Fields: speech recognition
- Workplaces: MIT Media Lab; Harvard Medical School; Dragon Systems
- Thesis: A new time-domain analysis of human speech and other complex waveforms (1975)
- Doctoral advisor: Raj Reddy

Janet MacIver Baker is an American computer scientist, neuroscientist and entrepreneur. Along with her husband James K. Baker, they founded Dragon Systems and are together credited with the creation of Dragon NaturallySpeaking.

In 2012, she received the IEEE James L. Flanagan Speech and Audio Processing Award with her husband.

Baker is affiliated with the MIT Media Lab and Harvard Medical School as a visiting scientist and lecturer.

== Early life and education ==
Baker trained as a biophysicist and pursued graduate studies at Rockefeller University in New York City beginning in 1970.

Baker transferred with James Baker to Carnegie Mellon University, a major center for artificial intelligence and speech understanding research. There, she completed her doctoral training and collaborated on foundational statistical approaches to speech recognition.

== Research career ==
At Carnegie Mellon in the early 1970s, Baker worked on speech recognition at a time when the dominant paradigm emphasized rule-based linguistics and symbolic artificial intelligence. In contrast, she and James Baker pursued a statistical, data-driven approach, applying probabilistic modeling techniques later known as Hidden Markov models (HMMs) to continuous speech.

After earning her doctorate in 1975, Baker joined IBM’s Thomas J. Watson Research Center, where she continued research on large-vocabulary, continuous speech recognition.

=== Dragon Systems ===
In 1982, Baker co-founded Dragon Systems with James Baker after the couple left IBM and later Exxon subsidiary Verbex. She was president of the company, while James Baker was chairman and CEO. Dragon Systems initially operated without venture capital, relying on revenue from contracts and early speech-recognition products.

In 1997, Dragon introduced Dragon NaturallySpeaking, the first continuous speech recognition software for desktop computers.
