= Li Tianmin =

Chinese politician and historian

Li Tianmin (Chinese: 李天民; pinyin: Lǐ Tiānmín, October 14, 1909 – June 24, 1993), or Li Tien-Min (romanised), was a Chinese Nationalist politician and political historian.

Born in Sichuan province, Li studied at the Central Military Academy in Wuhan (Chinese: 武汉中央军事政治学校) and completed his undergraduate studies in economics at Waseda University. He was elected as the Kuomintang candidate in 1948 to represent the municipality of Chengdu in Sichuan province in the Legislative Yuan of the Republic of China. He held this seat from 1948 until 1991, even after fleeing to Taiwan with the Nationalist government in 1949 at the end of the Chinese Civil War.

A historical biographer, and a professor at the National Chengchi University, he wrote six books on Chinese Communist party leaders Zhou Enlai, Mao Zedong, Liu Shaoqi, Deng Xiaoping, and Lin Biao.

Li had seven children. His second son and youngest child, Kai-Fu Lee, is a computer scientist and investor who was a former president of Google China and a founding director of Microsoft Research Asia.

== Books ==
- Chou En-Lai. Institute of International Relations, 1970.
- Liu Shao-ch'i: Mao's first heir-apparent. Institute of International Relations, 1975.
- Ping Zhou Enlai. Ming bao chu ban she, 1994. Published posthumously; translated into English as A review of Zhou Enlai. ISBN 962-357-694-3
