= AI Superpowers =

2018 book portraying artificial intelligence as an arms race

AI Superpowers: China, Silicon Valley, and the New World Order
- First edition
- Author: Kai-Fu Lee
- Language: English
- Publisher: Houghton Mifflin Harcourt
- Publication date: September 25, 2018
- Publication place: Boston
- Pages: 272
- ISBN: 9781328546395
- OCLC: 1035622189

AI Superpowers: China, Silicon Valley, and the New World Order is a 2018 non-fiction book by Kai-Fu Lee, an artificial intelligence (AI) pioneer, China expert and venture capitalist. Lee previously held executive positions at Apple, then SGI, Microsoft, and Google before creating his own company, Sinovation Ventures.

== AI arms race ==
According to Kai-Fu Lee, "If data is the new oil, then China is the new Saudi Arabia." Lee advances several arguments for why he thinks the artificial intelligence industry in China will excel in the artificial intelligence arms race:

1. Training deep learning models requires more of a brute force method than innovation; well suited to China's supposedly higher quantity but lower quality of software engineer compared to the US
2. China has fewer data protection regulations (e.g., the General Data Protection Regulation in Europe) than other countries, so Chinese software collect more data on users.
3. Chinese tech startup culture is more "aggressive" than that of other countries', with fewer intellectual property restrictions and fewer barriers to vertical integration
4. The participation of China's central government in funding and raising the status of the AI industry

== AI threat to employment ==
Lee proposes that knowledge workers are generally under greater threat of unemployment due to advances in AI, in a similar manner to the effect of the Industrial Revolution on physical laborers. The book includes examples of the most and least threatened jobs both in mental and physical labor.

Least threatened cognitive labor jobs include criminal defense attorney, public relations director, concierge, social worker, psychiatrist, and CEO because those jobs are highly social and are based on creativity or strategy. Cognitive jobs with the greatest threat to being made redundant by AI include: basic translator, radiologist, consumer loan officer, consumer tax prep, telemarketer, and customer service rep because those jobs are asocial and optimization-based.

Physical jobs at low risk of irrelevance in the AI era include elder caregiver, physical therapist, hairstylist, and dog trainer because those roles are social and require high dexterity in an unstructured environment. Physical jobs most likely to suffer job losses or extinction include assembly line inspector, fruit harvester, truck driver, dishwasher, clothing factory worker, fast food and restaurant cooks and cashiers because these are asocial jobs in structured environments and don't require dexterity.

== Reception ==
US Senator Mark Warner named AI Superpowers as his recommended book for The 2018 POLITICO 50 Reading List. On the other hand, American magazine Foreign Affairs criticized the book for promoting zero-sum thinking and hyping Chinese state investment in tech ventures that often underperform relative to expectations; for focusing on deep learning to the exclusion of other forms of artificial intelligence; and for overgeneralizing the usefulness of Chinese data sets.
