= Voice Navigator =

The Voice Navigator was the first voice recognition device for command and control of a graphical user interface (Patent no. 5377303). The system was developed by Articulate Systems, Inc. (founded in 1986) originally designed for the Apple Macintosh Plus and released in 1989. Subsequent versions were created for Microsoft Windows. Articulate Systems, Inc. was acquired by Dragon Systems in 1998.

The original system included both hardware and software. It was an elegant black base with a slick microphone. A software-only version was introduced in 1992 for computers with built-in microphone and adequate microprocessor (Mac IIsi, Mac Quadra AV).

The hardware consisted of a TMS320 digital signal processor, a Rockwell fax modem and a SCSI interface as well as a headset microphone.

The software consisted of Dragon Systems (acquired by Nuance) speaker dependent, discrete utterance, voice recognition driver and Articulate Systems patented voice control technology.

The software enabled voice control of any Macintosh application using context dependent synchronised grammars derived from the current processes and operating system data structures (menus, windows, controls) and events (mouse, key and AppleEvents). The system recognised spoken utterances and posted corresponding system events.

The system was designed to be extensible using a plug-in architecture (voice extensions) for custom functionality and included a software developer kit (SDK) for third-party applications.

== Products ==
Voice Navigator - The original version with fax modem capability.

Voice Navigator II - A low cost version with desktop microphone.

Voice Navigator SW - A software-only version for Macs with built-in microphones.

Voice Navigator SDK - The software developer kit for third-party applications.

== Derivatives ==
PowerSecretary - Voice command and control with dictation capability.

== Credits ==
The core engineering team included: Tom Firman, Tim Morgan, Dave Hoch, Dan Zimmerman, David Kelts and Glenn McElhoe. Peter Durlach was responsible for product management and marketing. Dana Morgan managed customer service, technical support and quality control. Ivan Mimica was the visionary CEO.
