= Tazti =

Speech recognition software package

- Developers: Voice Tech Group, Inc
- Initial release: May 2007; 18 years ago
- Stable release: 3.2 / January 2016; 9 years ago
- Operating system: Microsoft Windows 10
- Type: Speech recognition
- License: Proprietary
- Website: www.tazti.com

Tazti is a speech recognition software package developed and sold by Voice Tech Group, Inc. for Windows personal computers. The most recent package is version 3.2, which supports Windows 10, Windows 8.1, Windows 8 and Windows 7 64-bit editions. Earlier versions of Tazti supported Windows Vista and Windows XP. Tazti's primary features are playing PC video games by voice, controlling PC applications and programs by voice, and creating speech commands to trigger a browser to open web pages, or trigger the Windows operating system to open files, folders or programs. Earlier versions of Tazti included a lite Dictation feature that is eliminated from the latest version.

== Features ==
Tazti Speech Recognition software has four primary areas of functionality:

1. Play PC games by voice,
2. Control PC based applications and programs by voice,
3. Open files, folders and webpages by creating custom speech commands and associating them to file, folder or web URL.
4. Run programs that include command line parameters which may include batch flies to mash up Tazti to robots, robotics, web apps, or desktop or other programs not a part of Tazti.

Tazti utilizes a minimal user interface. As an example, user spoken speech commands appear in a balloon on the user interface dashboard as they are spoken allowing the user to confirm by sight the speech recognition quality.

== History ==
Voice Tech Group, Inc. was founded in 2005 as an Ohio corporation primarily concerned with the research of semantic search and voice search. Voice Tech Group, Inc. released Tazti Speech Recognition 1.0 as their first multi-feature speech recognition product in 2005. Early features include mashing up bookmarks and favorites to speech commands, website navigation by voice including of social media sites such as Facebook and Myspace, and voice control of iTunes. Voice Tech Group, Inc partnered with SR Tech Group LLC to develop speech and voice recognition technologies in 2013.

== Versions ==
Version	Release date	Operating Systems Supported
1.0	May 2007	XP / XP Pro, Vista
1.1.1	June 2008	XP / XP Pro, Vista
1.1.2	March 2009	XP / XP Pro, Vista
2.0.0	May 2010	XP / XP Pro, Vista, Windows 7
2.0.2	January 2011	XP / XP Pro, Vista, Windows 7
2.4	November 2011	XP / XP Pro, Vista, Windows 7
2.4.1	February 2012	XP / XP Pro, Vista, Windows 7
3.0	July 2013	Windows 7, Windows 8, Windows 8.1
3.2	January 2016	Windows 7, Windows 8, Windows 8.1, Windows 10

== See also ==
- List of speech recognition software
