= RWTH ASR =

RWTH ASR (short RASR) is a proprietary speech recognition toolkit.

The toolkit includes newly developed speech recognition technology for the development of automatic speech recognition systems. It has been developed by the Human Language Technology and Pattern Recognition Group at RWTH Aachen University.

RWTH ASR includes tools for the development of acoustic models and decoders as well as components for speaker adaptation, speaker adaptive training, unsupervised training, discriminative training, and word lattice processing. The software runs on Linux and Mac OS X. The project homepage offers ready-to-use models for research purposes, tutorials, and comprehensive documentation.

The toolkit is published under a license called "RWTH ASR License", which is derived from the QPL. This license grants free usage including re-distribution and modification for non-commercial use. Unlike QPL, it does not permit commercial use.

== See also ==
- List of speech recognition software
