= James K. Baker =

American speech recognition researcher

- Education: Princeton University; Carnegie Mellon University
- Known for: Dragon Systems
- Spouse: Janet M. Baker
- Scientific career
- Fields: speech recognition
- Workplaces: Dragon Systems
- Thesis: Stochastic Modeling as a Means of Automatic Speech Recognition (1975)
- Doctoral advisor: Raj Reddy

James K. Baker is an American entrepreneur and computer scientist. Along with his wife Janet M. Baker, they co-founded the Dragon Systems and together credited with the creation of Dragon NaturallySpeaking.

James Baker is an expert in speech recognition technology and a Distinguished Career Professor at Carnegie Mellon University. From June 2007 to 2009, Baker served as director of research at the Center of Excellence in Human Language at the Johns Hopkins University.

== Biography ==
Baker is a 1963 graduate of Yorktown High School (Arlington County, Virginia).

== Publications ==
1. Baker, J. (1975). "The DRAGON system—An overview". IEEE Transactions on Acoustics, Speech, and Signal Processing. 23: 24–29. doi:10.1109/TASSP.1975.1162650.
