= Statistical epidemiology =

Branch of the disciplines of epidemiology and biostatistics

Statistical epidemiology is an emerging branch of the disciplines of epidemiology and biostatistics that aims to:

- Bring more statistical rigour to bear in the field of epidemiology
- Recognise the importance of applied statistics, especially with respect to the context in which statistical methods are appropriate and inappropriate
- Aid and improve our interpretation of observations

== Introduction ==
The science of epidemiology has had enormous growth, particularly with charity and government funding. Many researchers have been trained to conduct studies, requiring multiple skills ranging from liaising with clinical staff to the statistical analysis of complex data, such as using Bayesian methods. The role of a Statistical Epidemiologist is to bring the most appropriate methods available to bear on observational study from medical research, requiring a broad appreciation of the underpinning methods and their context of applicability and interpretation.

The earliest mention of this phrase was in an article by EB Wilson, taking a critical look at the way in which statistical methods were developing and being applied in the science of epidemiology.

== Academic recognition ==
There are two Professors of Statistical Epidemiology in the United Kingdom (University of Leeds and Imperial College, London) and a Statistical Epidemiology group (Oxford University).

== Related fields ==
Statistical epidemiology draws upon quantitative methods from fields such as: statistics, operations research, computer science, economics, biology, and mathematics.

== See also ==
- Epidemiology
- Biostatistics
