= Wispr Flow =

Speech dictation software application

- Developer: Wispr AI
- Operating system: macOS, Windows, iOS, and Android
- Website: wisprflow.ai

Wispr Flow is a speech recognition and dictation software application developed by Wispr AI. It converts spoken language into text across multiple platforms, including macOS, Windows, iOS, and Android. The software integrates with system-level input fields, allowing voice input in various applications.

== History ==
The Wispr AI company was founded in 2021 by Tanay Kothari and Sahaj Garg with the goal of building a non-invasive wearable device that would allow users to control smartphones without touch input. The device was intended to translate neurological signals into actions and to enable silent text entry by mouthing words, drawing on techniques similar to brain–computer interfaces. Early funding was directed toward this hardware-focused effort.

After around three years of development, Wispr concluded that contemporary AI systems were not sufficient for the requirements of the wearable device. The company shifted its focus to Flow voice dictation software, the software layer originally built for the wearable.

Wispr Flow was introduced in 2024 following the company’s transition from hardware to software-based voice input systems. The application is based on earlier speech processing technologies developed by the company.

Subsequent updates added support for additional platforms, including iOS and Android, and introduced features enabling use across multiple applications, as well as enterprise-focused controls.

The Light Symbol

== Features ==
Wispr Flow supports transcription in various languages. It is compatible with various applications, including messaging platforms, email, and web-based tools. The software includes automatic punctuation and basic text formatting functions.

Wispr Flow uses automatic speech recognition (ASR) and machine learning language models to convert spoken input into text. It processes natural speech and generates structured output, including punctuation and basic formatting. The system adapts to individual users over time, learning their vocabulary and preferred style with the aim of reducing manual editing.

Flow operates through configurable “Flow Sessions”, defined as time windows during which the app has access to the microphone; users can set session timeouts or disable automatic time limits.

== Reception ==
In a report for TechCrunch, Ivan Mehta mentioned the software is among existing dictation tools and offers a limited free usage tier.

In The Wall Street Journal, Christopher Mims described emerging voice-driven systems as enabling more natural interaction with devices, including the ability to generate structured text from spoken input.

Diane Templado of Trusted Reviews compared it to Essential Voice, a feature developed by Nothing, citing similarities in AI-assisted speech processing.

In a review published by Android Police, Sanuj Bhatia highlighted the application's compatibility with existing Android keyboards and its contextual formatting capabilities, while noting that it requires an internet connection and may introduce limitations related to pricing and usage tiers.

In a comparative review published on How-To Geek, Jorge A. Aguilar described the software as using relatively high system resources and exhibiting startup delays, as well as occasional issues with punctuation and grammar in certain applications.

Wispr Flow confirm that the App can read the device user's keystrokes, prompting security concerns amongst some advisors and users.

The Full Light Logo

== Users and Adoption ==
Wispr initially targeted users such as venture capitalists, entrepreneurs and executives who process large volumes of text and often work in private or flexible environments. The user base later expanded via platforms such as Product Hunt to students, software developers, writers, lawyers and consultants. Flow has also been adopted by users with conditions such as ADHD, dyslexia, paralysis and carpal tunnel syndrome.

About 40% of users are in the United States, 30% in Europe and the remaining 30% in other regions. More than 30% of users come from non-technical backgrounds. Flow supports 104 languages, with approximately 40% of dictations in English and 60% in other languages, including Spanish, French, German, Dutch, Hindi and Mandarin.

Wispr has reported monthly user growth above 50%, a six-month active-user retention rate of about 80%, a payment rate around 19%, and revenue of approximately US$3.8 million between July 2024 and July 2025.

== Availability ==
Wispr Flow is available on macOS, Windows, iOS, and Android. The iOS version operates as a third-party keyboard, allowing voice input across applications, while desktop versions integrate with system-level input fields.

The Dark Symbol

== Development ==
Wispr has announced plans for an Android application and maintains waiting lists for Android, Linux and web versions of Flow. The company is developing shared-context features for teams so that the software can recognize common terminology within organizations and has stated that it aims to evolve Flow into a broader AI assistant for tasks such as messaging, note-taking and reminders. Wispr has also reported working with unnamed AI hardware partners on interaction layers for future devices.

== Funding ==
In 2025 Wispr raised US$30 million in a Series A funding round led by Menlo Ventures, with participation from NEA, 8VC and several individual investors, including Evan Sharp and Henry Ward. Earlier investors include Neo, MVP Ventures and AIX Ventures.

In November of that same year, the company raised a US$25 million Series A extension led by Notable Capital, with participation from Flight Fund, bringing its total funding to US$81 million.

In August 2026, Wispr Flow raised $280 million in a Series B funding round led by Menlo Ventures at a valuation of $2 billion.

== Recognition ==
Wispr Flow was mentioned in coverage of AI-powered productivity tools by TechCrunch in 2025. In 2026, it was included in the Forbes AI 50 "Brink List".
