= Speechmatics =

Technology company based in Cambridge, England

Speechmatics Ltd
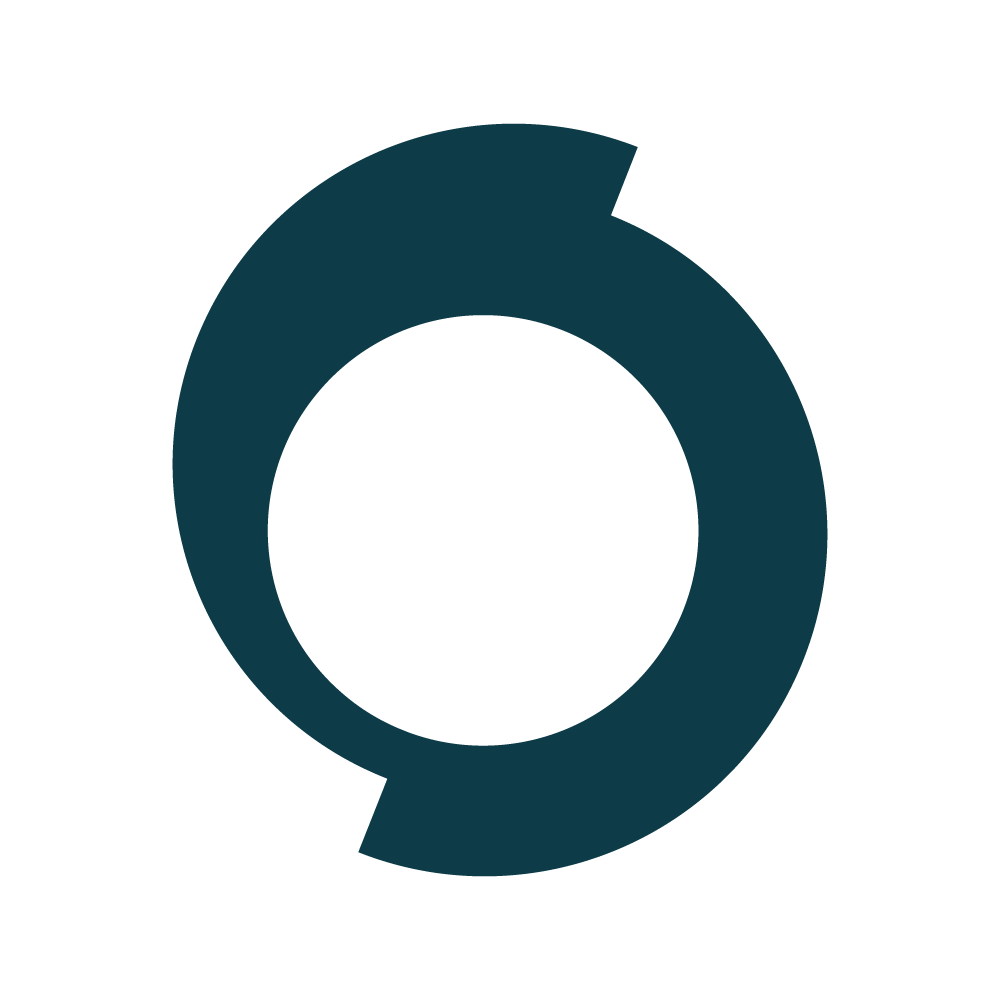
- Type: Privately held company
- Industry: Speech recognition
- Founded: 2006
- Founder: Tony Robinson
- Headquarters: Cambridge, UK
- Number of locations: Cambridge, UK, London, UK, Chennai, India, Brno, Czech Republic
- Area served: Global
- Key people: Katy Wigdahl (CEO)
- Products: Automatic Speech Recognition (ASR), Cloud-based ASR, Speech-to-text, Autonomous Speech Recognition
- Revenue: 11,342,008 euro (2021)
- Number of employees: 100-250
- Website: www.speechmatics.com

Speechmatics is a technology company based in Cambridge, England, which develops automatic speech recognition software (ASR) based on recurrent neural networks and statistical language modelling. Speechmatics was originally named Cantab Research Ltd when founded in 2006 by speech recognition specialist Dr. Tony Robinson.

Speechmatics offers its speech recognition for solution and service providers to integrate into their stack. Businesses can use Speechmatics to understand and transcribe speech into text. The technology can be deployed on-premises and in public or private cloud.

== History ==
Speechmatics was founded in 2006 by Tony Robinson who pioneered in the application of recurrent neural networks to speech recognition. He was among the early researchers to demonstrate the practical capabilities of deep neural networks and their use in speech recognition

In 2014, the company led the development of a billion-word text corpus for measuring progress in statistical language modelling and placed the corpus into the public domain to help accelerate the development of speech recognition technology.

In 2017, the company announced they had developed a new computational method for creating new language models at speed. Around the same time Speechmatics announced a partnership with Qatar Computing Research Institute (QCRI) to develop advanced Arabic speech to text services.

In 2018, Speechmatics became the first ASR provider to develop a Global English language pack which incorporates all dialects and accents of English into one single model.

In 2019, the company raised £6.35 million in venture capital investment in a Series A funding round. With investment from Albion Venture Capital, IQ Capital, and Amadeus Capital Partners, Speechmatics were able to scale into a fast-growth technology start-up. In the same year, the company won a Queen's Award for Innovation.

In 2020, Speechmatics began scaling beyond its product development and into physical geographic locations. The company opened offices in Brno, Czech Republic, Denver, USA and Chennai, India.

In March 2021, Speechmatics announced its launch on the Microsoft Azure Marketplace to offer any-context speech recognition technology at scale. The ability to consume Speechmatics’ speech recognition engine directly in the Microsoft Azure technology stack enables businesses to start using the technology quickly without barriers to adoption.

In December 2021, Speechmatics and consumer AI startup Personal.ai announced their partnership to offer individuals a personal AI that empower them to never forget their conversations, spoken notes, reminders, details of what they said during a meeting, and more — no matter the dialect of English that they use or accent that they carry.

In March 2023, Speechmatics released Ursa - a speech-to-text engine setting a new benchmark in transcription accuracy. Ursa, trained on millions of hours of audio data, aims to capture spoken words in noisy and challenging environments.

In July 2024, Speechmatics released Flow, an API for voice interactions. Flow allows businesses to build inclusive, seamless and responsive speech interactions into their products.

== Product and services ==
In February 2018, Speechmatics launched Global English, a single English language pack supporting all major English accents for use in speech-to-text transcription. Global English (GE) was trained through spoken data by users from 40 countries and billions of words drawn from global sources, making it comprehensive and accurate accent-agnostic transcription solutions on the market.

In November 2020, the company launched the first Global Spanish language pack on the market that supports all major Spanish accents. Global Spanish (GS) is a single Spanish language pack trained on data drawn across a wide range of diverse sources – specifically those from Latin America – making it the most accurate and comprehensive accent-independent Spanish language pack for speech-to-text.

In October 2021, Speechmatics launched its ‘Autonomous Speech Recognition’ software. Using the latest techniques in deep learning and with the introduction of its self-supervised models, Speechmatics outperformed Amazon, Apple, Google, and Microsoft in latest benchmarks.

== Awards and recognition ==
Speechmatics was named in the FT 1000: Europe's Fastest Growing Companies list for consecutive four years from 2019 to 2022.

In 2018, the company won SME National Business Awards in High Growth Business of the Year.

In 2019, Speechmatics won the 2019 Queen's Award for Enterprise in Innovation category.
