= Janus Recognition Toolkit =

General purpose speech recognition toolkit

Janus Recognition Toolkit (JRTk), sometimes referred to as Janus, is a general purpose speech recognition toolkit developed and maintained by the Interactive Systems Laboratories at Carnegie Mellon University and Karlsruhe Institute of Technology. It is useful for both research and application development and is part of the JANUS speech-to-speech translation system.

The JRTk provides a flexible Tcl/Tk script based environment which enables researchers to build state-of-the-art speech recognizers and allows them to develop, implement, and evaluate new methods. It implements an object oriented approach that unlike other toolkits is not a set of libraries and precompiled modules but a programmable shell with transparent, yet efficient objects.

Since version 5 JRTk features the IBIS decoder, a one-pass decoder that is based on a re-entrant single pronunciation prefix tree and makes use of the concept of linguistic context polymorphism. It is therefore able to incorporate full linguistic knowledge at an early stage. It is possible to decode in one pass, using the same engine in combination with a statistical n-gram language model as well as context- free grammars. It is also possible to use the decoder to rescore lattices in a very efficient way.

JRTk utilizes the concept of Hidden Markov Models (HMMs) for acoustic modeling and offers many state-of-the-art techniques for acoustic pre-processing, acoustic model training, and speech decoding. Through its flexible, object oriented architecture it allows to configure all components in a very flexible way (e.g., pre-processing steps to execute, HMM topology, training sequence, algorithm parameters, adaptation sequences, etc.), without the need to modify source code or recompile.

JRTk has been used by the Interactive System Labs in many projects for speech recognition, such as:

- EU-BRIDGE
- EVEIl-3D
- BABEL
- Quaero
- SFB 588
- TC-STAR
- FAME
- Verbmobil
- NESPOLE!
