= SpinVox =

SpinVox Ltd.
- Type: Private
- Industry: Telecommunications
- Founded: 2003
- Headquarters: Marlow, United Kingdom and New York, USA
- Area served: Global
- Key people: Co-Founders Christina Domecq, CEO and Daniel Doulton, Chief Strategy Officer
- Number of employees: 250 (2009)
- Website: SpinVox.com

SpinVox Ltd. was a start-up company that is now a subsidiary of global speech technology company Nuance Communications, an American multinational computer software technology corporation, headquartered in Burlington, Massachusetts, United States on the outskirts of Boston, that provides speech and imaging applications. Initially, SpinVox provided voice-to-text conversion services for carrier markets, including wireless, fixed, VoIP and cable, as well as for unified communications, enterprise and Web 2.0 environments. This service was provided through an automated computer system, with human intervention where needed. However, there were unsubstantiated accusations that the system operated almost exclusively through the use of call-center workers in South Africa and the Philippines despite the fact that it had 10 million global users as of December 2008 and in February 2009 processed its 100 millionth message conversion.

== Company history ==
The company was founded in 2003 by Christina Domecq and Daniel Doulton as featured in the BBC's prominent Newsnight programme. The company had raised $200 million in funding. Company accounts for the company in 2007 stated that SpinVox made a loss of £36 million against £2 million of revenue. In April 2008 Vodaphone Spain customers were given access to Spinvox technology. In May 2008 the company named Todd Woodstra vice president of global unified communications sales and Brian Tyler unified communications business development manager both of whom had ample experience in speech as Woodstra originally led the Global Network Speech division at Nuance Communications and Tyler had spent a decade at Nuance. In August 2008 the Company received a glowing review of its technology from Stephen Fry in his Guardian Newspaper column. In October 2008 SpinVox launched its first service in Latin America for all Movistar subscribers in Chile. In July 2009, in response to cash-flow problems it asked staff to take all or part of their salaries in stock to reduce costs. In August 2009, a dossier, alleging financial irregularities, was circulated to shareholders, leading to the company launching an inquiry into the activities of some senior executives. Unaudited accounts for 2008 show the group's pre-tax loss widened to £49 million compared with £37 million a year earlier In September 2009, Invesco Perpetual stated that it had written down the value of its investment in the company by 90% and that Spinvox was for sale. SpinVox was sold to US company Nuance Communications for $103 million (£64 million) in December 2009 with Nuance's own annual report for 2010 revealing an enterprise value of $166 million.

== Technology ==
The Voice Message Conversion System (VMCS) worked by combining speech technologies with live learning capabilities and human quality control. It was developed by the SpinVox Advanced Speech Group based in Cambridge, UK, led by Cambridge academic entrepreneur Dr. Tony Robinson, included Cambridge University Professor Phil Woodland and involved collaboration with researchers associated with the University of Cambridge's HTK (Hidden Markov Model Toolkit) speech-recognition group, contributing to the development of its proprietary voice-processing systems. The company supported the following languages: English; French, Spanish, German, Italian and Portuguese. Parent company Nuance Communications claimed that "SpinVox is offering something that is impossible to deliver now". Patent applications filed by the company in 2004 and 2008 note that "because human operators are used instead of machine transcription, voicemails are converted accurately, intelligently, appropriately and succinctly into text messages".

The partnership between Apple and Nuance Communications was publicly confirmed in May 2013, when Nuance chief executive Paul Ricci said that the company was a "fundamental provider of voice recognition for Apple". According to reports, Nuance's technology provided the speech-recognition engine that powered Siri at its launch in 2011. In 2022, Microsoft acquired Nuance Communications Inc. for $19.7 billion which became the foundation of its AI investments and deployment which includes OpenAI’s ChatGPT in Copilot. As of January 2025, Apple’s Siri service is used on approximately 500m devices worldwide. In addition, SpinVox speech technology was widely deployed across Microsoft (Nuance’s) medical transcription and IVR systems and is still in use in major TelCo networks to convert voicemails to text.

== Awards and recognition ==
The company and its founders also received industry recognition during this period including the GSMA Innovation Award and the Ernst & Young Entrepreneur of the Year Award. Daniel Doulton was named one of Speech Technology Magazine's "Speech Luminaries" in 2009.

SpinVox CEO Christina Domecq received CNBC's European Business Leader Award.

SpinVox was nominated for the GSMA Mobile Innovation Grand Prix in the EMEA region.

In 2009 the World Economic Forum recognised SpinVox for creating the world's first text conversion service, revolutionising the way people communicate over five continents in six languages and with more than ten million users.

== Data protection issues ==
A 2009 investigation by the BBC technology correspondent Rory Cellan-Jones alleged that the company transfers voicemail data out of the European Union to call centres in South Africa and the Philippines, in breach of its entry on the UK Register of data controllers, and that most of the transcription is done by humans rather than software. SpinVox admitted that "parts of messages can be sent to a 'conversion expert'", but also claimed that "the part sent is anonymised so that there is no way of tracking back a particular number or person".

SpinVox responded to allegations and stated that the company was in compliance with the Data Protection Act 1998. In a statement, the company said that the act permitted the processing of data outside of the EEA.
