= Sinovation Ventures =

China-based venture capital firm

- Native name: 创新工场
- Formerly: Innovation Works
- Company type: Private
- Industry: Venture Capital
- Founded: 7 September 2009; 16 years ago
- Founders: Kai-Fu Lee; Hua Wang
- Headquarters: Beijing, China
- Key people: Kai-Fu Lee (CEO)
- Products: Investments
- AUM: US$3 billion (2022)
- Website: sinovationventures.com

Sinovation Ventures (Chinese: 创新工场; pinyin: Chuàngxīn Gōngchǎng) is a Beijing-based venture capital firm founded in 2009. The firm focuses on investing in startups that use artificial intelligence technology. It was one of the first Chinese venture capital firms to establish a presence in the United States.

== Background ==
Kai-Fu Lee was President of Google China from July 2005 to 4 September 2009. A few days after resigning from his post, on 7 September 2009, he announced he would be starting a $115m venture capital fund called "Innovation Works". His colleague, Hua Wang, who was previously Head of Business Development in Google China joined him as a co-founder.

In 2013, an office was opened in Silicon Valley to invest in US startups.

In 2016, the firm rebranded from "Innovation Works" to "Sinovation Ventures".

In 2019, the firm closed its Silicon Valley office citing the China–United States trade war making it difficult to get into US deals.

== Funds ==
Fund	Vintage Year	Committed Capital ($m)
Sinovation Fund I	2011	USD 180
Sinovation Fund II	2012	USD 275
RMB Fund I	2012	USD 48.5
Sinovation Fund III	2016	USD 207
RMB Fund II	2016	USD 380
Sinovation Fund IV	2018	USD 500
Artificial intelligence fund	2018	USD 391
RMB Fund III	2019	USD 361
Sinovation Fund V	2022	USD 203

== Investments ==
- 01.AI
- 4Paradigm
- AdMob
- Bitmain
- Insilico Medicine
- Megvii
- MeituPic
- Mobike
- Momenta
- Niu Technologies
- Planetary Resources
- Securly
- TuSimple
- VIPKid
- WeRide
- Wonder Workshop
- Zhihu
