= Transcription (linguistics) =

Systematic representation of language in written form

In linguistics, transcription is the systematic representation of spoken language in written form. The source can either be utterances (speech or sign language) or preexisting text in another writing system.

Transcription should not be confused with translation, which means representing the meaning of text from a source-language in a target language, (e.g. Los Angeles (from source-language Spanish) means The Angels in the target language English); or with transliteration, which means representing the spelling of a text from one script to another.

In the academic discipline of linguistics, transcription is an essential part of the methodologies of (among others) phonetics, conversation analysis, dialectology, and sociolinguistics. It also plays an important role for several subfields of speech technology. Common examples for transcriptions outside academia are the proceedings of a court hearing such as a criminal trial (by a court reporter) or a physician's recorded voice notes (medical transcription). This article focuses on transcription in linguistics.

== Phonetic and orthographic transcription ==
There are two main types of linguistic transcription. Phonetic transcription focuses on phonetic and phonological properties of spoken language. Systems for phonetic transcription thus furnish rules for mapping individual sounds or phones to written symbols. Systems for orthographic transcription, by contrast, consist of rules for mapping spoken words onto written forms as prescribed by the orthography of a given language. Phonetic transcription operates with specially defined character sets, usually the International Phonetic Alphabet.

The type of transcription chosen depends mostly on the context of usage. Because phonetic transcription strictly foregrounds the phonetic nature of language, it is mostly used for phonetic or phonological analyses. Orthographic transcription, however, has a morphological and a lexical component alongside the phonetic component (which aspect is represented to which degree depends on the language and orthography in question). This form of transcription is thus more convenient wherever semantic aspects of spoken language are transcribed. Phonetic transcription is more systematic in a scientific sense, but it is also more difficult to learn, more time-consuming to carry out and less widely applicable than orthographic transcription.

== As a theory ==
Mapping spoken language onto written symbols is not as straightforward a process as may seem at first glance. Written language is an idealization, made up of a limited set of clearly distinct and discrete symbols. Spoken language, on the other hand, is a continuous (as opposed to discrete) phenomenon, made up of a potentially unlimited number of components. There is no predetermined system for distinguishing and classifying these components and, consequently, no preset way of mapping these components onto written symbols.

Literature is relatively consistent in pointing out the nonneutrality of transcription practices. There is not and cannot be a neutral transcription system. Knowledge of social culture enters directly into the making of a transcript. They are captured in the texture of the transcript (Baker, 2005).

== Transcription systems ==
Transcription systems are sets of rules which define how spoken language is to be represented in written symbols. Most phonetic transcription systems are based on the International Phonetic Alphabet or, especially in speech technology, on its derivative SAMPA.

Examples for orthographic transcription systems (all from the field of conversation analysis or related fields) are:

=== CA (conversation analysis) ===
Arguably the first system of its kind, originally sketched in (Sacks et al. 1978), later adapted for use in computer readable corpora as CA-CHAT by (MacWhinney 2000). The field of Conversation Analysis itself includes a number of distinct approaches to transcription and sets of transcription conventions. These include, among others, Jefferson Notation. To analyze conversation, recorded data is typically transcribed into a written form that is agreeable to analysts. There are two common approaches. The first, called narrow transcription, captures the details of conversational interaction such as which particular words are stressed, which words are spoken with increased loudness, points at which the turns-at-talk overlap, how particular words are articulated, and so on. If such detail is less important, perhaps because the analyst is more concerned with the overall gross structure of the conversation or the relative distribution of turns-at-talk amongst the participants, then a second type of transcription known as broad transcription may be sufficient (Williamson, 2009).

==== Jefferson Transcription System ====
The Jefferson Transcription System is a set of symbols, developed by Gail Jefferson, which is used for transcribing talk. Having had some previous experience in transcribing when she was hired in 1963 as a clerk typist at the UCLA Department of Public Health to transcribe sensitivity-training sessions for prison guards, Jefferson began transcribing some of the recordings that served as the materials out of which Harvey Sacks' earliest lectures were developed. Over four decades, for the majority of which she held no university position and was unsalaried, Jefferson's research into talk-in-interaction has set the standard for what became known as conversation analysis (CA). Her work has greatly influenced the sociological study of interaction, but also disciplines beyond, especially linguistics, communication, and anthropology. This system is employed universally by those working from the CA perspective and is regarded as having become a near-globalized set of instructions for transcription.

=== DT (discourse transcription) ===
A system described in (DuBois et al. 1992), further developed as DT2 in a partial compromise with CA, is used for transcription of the Santa Barbara Corpus of Spoken American English (SBCSAE).

Central to DT is the separation of the text into prosodic units, with one unit per line. Terminating each unit is a punctuation mark, with a period for final prosody, a comma for continuing prosody, and an em dash for truncated prosody. A question mark may be added for appeal intonation (e.g. ⟨?,⟩ or ⟨?.⟩). Overlapping speech is indicated with square brackets where the overlap begins and ends. Where there are multiple overlaps in the same section of text, they may be distinguished with numerical indices. Pauses, laughter, pitch-reset, stress and voice quality are all indicated. For example, ⟨@@⟩ indicates two pulses of laughter, while ⟨@word⟩ indicates a laughing quality of the voice; ⟨##⟩ indicates two unintelligible syllables, while ⟨#word⟩ indicates uncertain identification of a word.

=== GAT (Gesprächsanalytisches Transkriptionssystem – Conversation analytic transcription system) ===
A system described in (Selting et al. 1998), later developed further into GAT2 (Selting et al. 2009), widely used in German speaking countries for prosodically oriented conversation analysis and interactional linguistics.

=== HIAT (Halbinterpretative Arbeitstranskriptionen – Semiinterpretative working transcriptions) ===
Arguably the first system of its kind, originally described in (Ehlich and Rehbein 1976) – see (Ehlich 1992) for an English reference - adapted for the use in computer readable corpora as (Rehbein et al. 2004), and widely used in functional pragmatics.

== Software ==
Transcription was originally a process carried out manually, i.e. with pencil and paper, using an analogue sound recording stored on, e.g., a Compact Cassette. Nowadays, most transcription is done on computers. Recordings are usually digital audio files or video files, and transcriptions are electronic documents. Specialized computer software exists to assist the transcriber in efficiently creating a digital transcription from a digital recording.

Two types of transcription software can be used to assist the process of transcription: one that facilitates manual transcription and the other automated transcription. For the former, the work is still very much done by a human transcriber who listens to a recording and types up what is heard in a computer, and this type of software is often a multimedia player with functionality such as playback or changing speed. For the latter, automated transcription is achieved by a speech-to-text engine which converts audio or video files into electronic text. Some of the software would also include the function of annotation.

== See also ==
- Interlinear gloss
- Phonetic transcription
- Speech recognition
- Subtitle (captioning)
- Textual scholarship
- Transcription (service)
- Transcription software
