= HTK (software) =

HTK (Hidden Markov Model Toolkit) is a proprietary software toolkit for handling HMMs. It is mainly intended for speech recognition, but has been used in many other pattern recognition applications that employ HMMs, including speech synthesis, character recognition and DNA sequencing.

Originally developed at the Machine Intelligence Laboratory (formerly known as the Speech Vision and Robotics Group) of the Cambridge University Engineering Department (CUED), the rights to sell HTK were acquired by Entropic Research Laboratory Inc. in 1993, and development was transferred to Entropic in 1995. Entropic was acquired by Microsoft in 1999, which subsequently licensed HTK back to CUED, allowing the university to resume distribution and development. HTK is now being widely used among researchers who are working on HMMs.

== See also ==
- List of speech recognition software
