= Dragon NaturallySpeaking =

Speech recognition software package

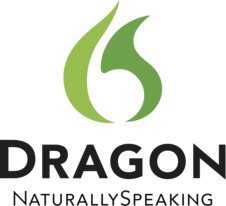

- A sample dictation in Microsoft Word 2010
- Developer: Nuance Communications
- Release: June 1997; 29 years ago
- Stable release: 16 / February 28, 2023; 3 years ago
- Operating system: Microsoft Windows
- Available in: 8 languages
- Type: Speech recognition
- License: Proprietary

Dragon NaturallySpeaking (also known as Dragon for PC, or DNS) is a speech recognition software package developed by Dragon Systems of Newton, Massachusetts, which was acquired in turn by Lernout & Hauspie Speech Products, Nuance Communications, and Microsoft. It runs on Windows personal computers. Version 15 (Professional Individual and Legal Individual), which supports 32-bit and 64-bit editions of Windows 7, 8 and 10, was released in August 2016.

== Features ==
Dragon NaturallySpeaking uses a minimal user interface. The software can recognize voice and transcribe it, recognize and execute spoken commands, and has text-to-speech, meaning that it speaks the text contents of a document. Dictated words appear in a floating tooltip as they are spoken (there is an option to suppress this display to increase speed), and when the speaker pauses, the program transcribes the words at the cursor location on the active window; Dragon does not support dictating to background windows. Voice profiles can be accessed by different computers in a networked environment, although the audio hardware and configuration must be identical to those of the machine generating the configuration. The Professional version allows creation of custom commands and import of custom word lists to control programs or functions not built into NaturallySpeaking.

== History ==
Dr. James Baker laid out the description of a speech understanding system called DRAGON in 1975. In 1982, he and Dr. Janet M. Baker, his wife, founded Dragon Systems to release products centered around their voice recognition prototype. He was President of the company and she was CEO.

DragonDictate was first released for MS-DOS using hidden Markov models, a probabilistic method for temporal pattern recognition. At the time, the hardware was not powerful enough to address the problem of word segmentation, and DragonDictate was unable to determine the boundaries of words during continuous speech input. Users were forced to enunciate one word at a time, clearly separated by a small pause after each word. DragonDictate was based on a trigram model, and is known as a discrete utterance speech recognition engine.

Dragon Systems released NaturallySpeaking 1.0 as their first continuous dictation product in 1997.

The company was then purchased in June 2000 by Lernout & Hauspie, a Belgium-based corporation that was subsequently found to have been perpetrating financial fraud. Following the all-share deal advised by Goldman Sachs, Lernout & Hauspie declared bankruptcy in November 2000. The deal was not originally supposed to be all stock and the unavailability of the Goldman Sachs team to advise concerning the change in terms was one of the grounds of the Bakers' subsequent lawsuit. The Bakers had received stock worth hundreds of millions of US dollars, but were only able to sell a few million dollars' worth before the stock lost all its value as a result of the accounting fraud. The Bakers sued Goldman Sachs for negligence, intentional misrepresentation and breach of fiduciary duty, which led to a 23-day trial in Boston in January 2013. The jury cleared Goldman Sachs of all charges. Following the bankruptcy of Lernout & Hauspie, the rights to the Dragon product line were acquired by ScanSoft of Burlington, Massachusetts, also a Goldman Sachs client. In 2005 ScanSoft launched a de facto acquisition of Nuance Communications, and rebranded itself as Nuance.

As of 2012, LG Smart TVs included voice recognition feature powered by the same speech engine as Dragon NaturallySpeaking. In 2014, following the discontinuation of DragonDictate for Mac, a product dating back to Nuance's 2010 purchase of MacSpeech Dictate, NaturallySpeaking gained Mac compatibility, though Mac support was later terminated in 2018.

In 2021, Microsoft announced plans to acquire Nuance, and therefore Dragon NaturallySpeaking. The acquisition completed in March 2022.

== Versions ==
| Dragon Naturally Speaking Version | Release date | Editions | Operating Systems Supported |
|---|---|---|---|
| 1.0 | April 1997 | Personal | Windows 95, NT 4.0. |
| 2.0 | November 1997 | Standard, Preferred, Deluxe | Windows 95, NT 4.0 |
| 3.0 | October 1998 | Point & Speak, Standard, Preferred, Professional (with optional Legal and Medical add-on products) | Windows 95, 98, NT 4.0. |
| 4.0 | August 4, 1999 | Essentials, Standard, Preferred, Professional, Legal, Medical, Mobile | Windows 95, 98, NT 4.0 SP3+. |
| 5.0 | August 2000 | Essentials, Standard, Preferred, Professional, Legal, Medical | Windows 98, Me, NT 4.0 SP6+, 2000. |
| 6.0 | November 15, 2001 | Essentials, Standard, Preferred, Professional, Legal, Medical | |
| 7.0 | March 2003 | Essentials, Standard, Preferred, Professional, Legal, Medical | Windows 98SE, Me, NT4 SP6+, 2000, XP. |
| 8.0 | November 2004 | Essentials, Standard, Preferred, Professional, Legal, Medical | Windows Me (Only Standard and Preferred editions), Windows 2000 SP4+, Windows XP SP1+. |
| 9.0 | July 2006 | Standard, Preferred, Professional, Legal, Medical, SDK client, SDK server, | Windows 2000 SP4+, XP SP1+. |
| 9.5 | January 2007 | Standard, Preferred, Professional, Legal, Medical, SDK client, SDK server | Windows 2000 SP4+, XP SP1+, Vista (32-bit). |
| 10.0 | August 7, 2008 | Essentials, Standard, Preferred, Professional, Legal, Medical | Windows 2000 SP4+, XP SP2+ (32-bit), Vista (32-bit). Server 2003. |
| 10.1 | March 2009 | Standard, Preferred, Professional, Legal, Medical | Windows 2000 SP4+, XP SP2+ (32-bit), Vista (32-bit and 64-bit), Windows 7 (32 and 64-bit). Server 2003. |
| 11.0 | August 2010 | Home, Premium, Professional, Legal | Windows XP SP2+ (32-bit), Vista SP1+ (32-bit and 64-bit), 7 (32 and 64-bit). Server 2003, 2008. |
| 11.0 | 2011 | SDK client (DSC), SDK server (DSS) | Windows XP SP2+ (32-bit only), Vista SP1+ (32-bit and 64-bit), Windows 7 (32-bit and 64-bit), Windows Server 2003 and 2008, SP1, SP2 and R2 (32-bit and 64-bit) |
| 11.5 | June 2011 | Home, Premium, Professional, Legal | Windows XP SP2+ (32-bit), Vista SP1+ (32-bit and 64-bit), 7 (32 and 64-bit). Server 2003, 2008. |
| 11.0 | August 2011 | Medical (Dragon Medical Practice Edition) | Windows XP SP2+ (32-bit), Vista SP1+ (32-bit and 64-bit), 7 (32 and 64-bit). Server 2003, 2008. |
| 12.0 | October 2012 | Home, Premium, Professional, Legal | Windows XP SP3+ (32-bit), Vista SP2+ (32-bit and 64-bit), 7 (32 and 64-bit), 8 (32 and 64-bit). Server 2008, Server 2008 R2, Server 2012. |
| 12.5 | February 2013 | Home, Premium, Professional, Legal | Windows XP SP3+ (32-bit), Vista SP2+ (32-bit and 64-bit), 7 (32 and 64-bit), 8 (32 and 64-bit). Server 2008, Server 2008 R2, Server 2012. |
| 12 | June 2013 | Medical (Dragon Medical Practice Edition 2) | Windows XP SP3+ (32-bit), Vista SP2+ (32-bit and 64-bit), 7 (32 and 64-bit), 8 (32 and 64-bit). Server 2008, Server 2008 R2, Server 2012. |
| 13 | August 2014 | Home, Premium, Professional, and Legal. | 7 (32 and 64-bit), 8.1 (32 and 64-bit). Server 2008, Server 2008 R2, Server 2012. Mac OS X 10.6+ |
| 13 | September 2015 | Medical (UK, French, German) (Dragon Medical Practice Edition 3) | 7 (32 and 64-bit), 8.1 (32 and 64-bit), 10 (32 and 64-bit). Server 2008, Server 2008 R2, Server 2012. Mac OS X 10.6+ |
| 14 | September 2015 | Professional (individual, and Group) | 7 (32 and 64-bit), 8.1 (32 and 64-bit), 10 (32 and 64-bit). Server 2008, Server 2008 R2, Server 2012. Mac OS X 10.6+. Server 2008, Server 2008 R2, Server 2012. |
| 15 | August 16, 2016 | Dragon Professional Individual; Dragon Legal Individual; Dragon Professional Individual for Mac (version 6) | 7, 8.1, 10 (32- and 64-bit); Server 2008 R2, Server 2012 R2. Mac OS X 0.11, macOS 10.12 |
| 15 | May 1, 2017 | Dragon Professional Group (Languages: English US and German only) | 7, 8.1, and 10, 32-bit and 64-bit |
| 15 | January 22, 2018 | Dragon Medical Practice Edition 4 (Languages: English US) | |
| 16 | February 28, 2023 | Dragon Professional | Windows 10, 11, Server 2016, 2019 and 2022 |

== See also ==
- Braina
- List of speech recognition software
