= Transcription software =

Software that assists in the conversion of human speech into a text transcript

Transcription software assists in the conversion of human speech into a text transcript. Audio or video files can be transcribed manually or automatically. Transcriptionists can replay a recording several times in a transcription editor and type what they hear. By using transcription hot keys, the manual transcription can be accelerated, the sound filtered, equalized or have the tempo adjusted when the clarity is not great. With speech recognition technology, transcriptionists can automatically convert recordings to text transcripts by opening recordings in a PC and uploading them to a cloud for automatic transcription, or transcribe recordings in real-time by using digital dictation. Depending on quality of recordings, machine generated transcripts may still need to be manually verified. The accuracy rate of the automatic transcription depends on several factors such as background noises, speakers' distance to the microphone, and accents.

Transcription software, as with transcription services, is often used for business, legal, or medical purposes. Compared with audio content, a text transcript is searchable, takes up less computer memory, and can be used as an alternate method of communication, such as for subtitles and closed captions. Some clinical environments also use digital tools to support transcription workflows, including ambient documentation systems that employ Speech recognition to capture portions of clinical encounters and generate draft notes for later review. These tools are typically used alongside conventional transcription methods.

The definition of transcription "software", as compared with transcription "service", is that the former is sufficiently automated that a user can run the entire system without engaging outside personnel. New software-as-a-service and cloud computing models use artificial intelligence, machine learning and natural language processing to convert speech to text and continuously learn new phrases and accents. AI transcription can, however, lead to hallucinations and other errors.

== Development ==
Research at Google released a free android app Google Live Transcribe, it runs on Google Cloud. Google Chrome developed and has an available build in English Live Caption. Google Docs, Google Translate, Google Assistant, Gboard and other apps that use Google's Speech Recognition & Synthesis engine support the transcription tool too.

OpenAI launched Whisper, an open-source speech recognition deep learning model in September 2022.

In 2024, an AI-powered transcription platform, Transkriptor, was launched, enabling the automatic conversion of audio and video recordings into text using speech recognition technology, with support for transcription in 100 languages and processing of content uploaded via a web interface as well as mobile and browser extensions. It is part of the Tor.app suite of AI-based language processing tools.

== See also ==
- Digital dictation
- Optical character recognition
- Speech synthesis
