= Acoustic model =

An acoustic model is used in automatic speech recognition to represent the relationship between an audio signal and the phonemes or other linguistic units that make up speech. The model is learned from a set of audio recordings and their corresponding transcripts. It is created by taking audio recordings of speech, and their text transcriptions, and using software to create statistical representations of the sounds that make up each word.

== Background ==
Modern speech recognition systems use both an acoustic model and a language model to represent the statistical properties of speech. The acoustic model models the relationship between the audio signal and the phonetic units in the language. The language model is responsible for modeling the word sequences in the language. These two models are combined to get the top-ranked word sequences corresponding to a given audio segment.

Most modern speech recognition systems operate on the audio in small chunks known as frames with an approximate duration of 10ms per frame. The raw audio signal from each frame can be transformed by applying the mel-frequency cepstrum. The coefficients from this transformation are commonly known as mel-frequency cepstral coefficients (MFCCs) and are used as an input to the acoustic model along with other features.

Recently, the use of convolutional neural networks has led to major improvements in acoustic modeling.

== Speech audio characteristics ==
Audio can be encoded at different sampling rates (i.e. samples per second – the most common being: 8, 16, 32, 44.1, 48, and 96 kHz), and different bits per sample (the most common being: 8-bits, 16-bits, 24-bits or 32-bits). Speech recognition engines work best if the acoustic model they use was trained with speech audio which was recorded at the same sampling rate/bits per sample as the speech being recognized.

== Telephony-based speech recognition ==
The limiting factor for telephony based speech recognition is the bandwidth at which speech can be transmitted. For example, a standard land-line telephone only has a bandwidth of 64 kbit/s at a sampling rate of 8 kHz and 8-bits per sample (8000 samples per second * 8-bits per sample = 64000 bit/s). Therefore, for telephony based speech recognition, acoustic models should be trained with 8 kHz/8-bit speech audio files.

In the case of voice over IP, the codec determines the sampling rate/bits per sample of speech transmission. Codecs with a higher sampling rate/bits per sample for speech transmission (which improve the sound quality) necessitate acoustic models trained with audio data that matches that sampling rate/bits per sample.

== Desktop-based speech recognition ==
For speech recognition on a standard desktop PC, the limiting factor is the sound card. Most sound cards today can record at sampling rates of between 16–48 kHz of audio, with bit rates of 8- to 16-bits per sample, and playback at up to 96 kHz.

As a general rule, a speech recognition engine works better with acoustic models trained with speech audio data recorded at higher sampling rates/bits per sample. But using audio with too high a sampling rate/bits per sample can slow the recognition engine down. A compromise is needed. Thus for desktop speech recognition, the current standard is acoustic models trained with speech audio data recorded at sampling rates of 16 kHz/16 bits per sample.
