= Gift (disambiguation) =

A gift is a present.

Gift or gifts may also refer to:

== Literature ==
- Gift (Kielland novel), an 1883 novel by Alexander Kielland
- "Gifts" (poem), a 1966 poem by Oodgeroo Noonuccal (Kath Walker)
- Gifts (novel), one of the novels in the Annals of the Western Shore series by Ursula K. Le Guin
- Gift (visual novel), a 2006 Japanese visual novel and anime series
- Gift (picture book), a 2023 picture book by Japanese figure skater Yuzuru Hanyu and manga artist group Clamp

== Computing ==
- giFT, a file-sharing computer program
- GIFT (file format), the file format for storing multi-choice, short answer, matching and other questions
- Gift (video game), 3D platform game by Eko System

== Film and visual arts ==
- Gift (1966 film), a 1966 Danish film
- Gift (1993 film), a 1993 film by Perry Farrell and Casey Niccoli
- A Gift (film), a 2016 Thai film
- Gift (1997 Japanese TV series), a Japanese drama television series starring Takuya Kimura
- Gift (2026 Japanese TV series), a Japanese television drama series starring Shinichi Tsutsumi
- Gift (South Korean TV series), an upcoming 2026 South Korean television series
- ".hack//Gift", an anime original video animation in the .hack series

== Music ==
=== Albums ===
- Gift (Curve album)
- Gift (The Sisterhood album)
- Gift (Taproot album), 2000
- A Gift (album), an album by Canadian country singer Paul Brandt
- Gift (The Autumns EP), 2003
- Gift (Kanjani Eight EP), 2009

=== Songs ===
- "Gift" (Maaya Sakamoto song), 1997
- "Gift" (Ai song), 2020
- "Gifts" (song), a 2008 R&B song by Ray J from his album All I Feel

== Acronyms ==
- Gamete intrafallopian transfer, infertility treatment
- Global Internet Freedom Task Force of the US government
- Graduate Institute of Ferrous Technology, Pohang University of Science and Technology
- Greater Internet Fuckwad Theory, an unofficial name for the online disinhibition effect
- Gujarat International Finance Tec-City, India
- United Nations Global Initiative to Fight Human Trafficking
- The Global Institute for Tomorrow, Hong Kong

== People ==
- Gift (given name)
- Gift (surname)

== Other uses ==
- Diplomatic gift
- Gift (law), the legal aspects of property
- Gift economy, an economic system in which participants give away things of value to the shared benefit of the community
- Gift (ice show), produced by Japanese figure skater Yuzuru Hanyu
- "Gifts", a Series G episode of the television series QI (2010)

== See also ==
- Gifted (disambiguation)
- Gift of Gab (disambiguation)
- The Gift (disambiguation)
- Present (disambiguation)
