= Gift (given name) =

Gift is a given name. Notable people with the name include:

- Gift Atulewa (1986–2024), Nigerian footballer
- Gift Banda (born 1969), Zimbabwean politician
- Gift Bright (born 2010), Nigerian sprinter
- Gift Fred (born 1998), Ugandan footballer
- Gift Johnbull (born 1991), Nigerian politician
- Gift Kampamba (born 1979), Zambian footballer
- Gift Leotlela (born 1998), South African sprinter
- Gift Leremi (1984–2007), South African footballer
- Gift Lunga (born 1976), Zimbabwean footballer
- Gift Mbweti (born 1991), Zimbabwean footballer
- Gift Monday (born 2001), Nigerian footballer
- Gift Motupa (born 1994), South African footballer
- Gift Moyo (born 1990), Botswanan footballer
- Gift Mphande (born 2003), Zambian footballer
- Gift Muzadzi (born 1974), Zimbabwean football goalkeeper
- Gift Ngoepe (born 1990), South African baseball player
- Gift Orban (born 2002), Nigerian footballer
- Gift Otuwe (born 1984), Nigerian football midfielder
- Gift Raikhan (born 1981), Indian footballer
- Gift Sialubalo (born 1969), Zambian politician
- Gift Siame (born 2006), Zambian football midfielder
- Gift Showemimo (born 1974), Nigerian footballer
- Gift Tandare (died 2007), Zimbabwe politician
- Gift van Staden (born 1962), South African politician
- Gift Zulu (born 1992), Zambian footballer
