= Anorexia (symptom) =

Loss of appetite

- Specialty: Gastroenterology, family medicine, internal medicine
- Symptoms: Not wanting to eat, no hunger, dizziness, weakness
- Causes: Achy stomach, gastroparesis, food poisoning

Anorexia is a medical term for loss of appetite. While the term outside of the scientific literature is often used interchangeably with anorexia nervosa, many possible causes exist for a loss of appetite, some of which may be harmless, while others indicate a serious clinical condition or pose a significant risk.

Anorexia in this usage is a symptom, not a diagnosis.

The symptom also occurs in non-human animals, such as cats, dogs, cattle, goats, and sheep. In these species, anorexia may be referred to as inappetence. As in humans, loss of appetite can be due to a range of diseases and conditions, as well as environmental and psychological factors.

== Etymology ==
The term is from Ancient Greek: ανορεξία (ἀν-, 'without' + όρεξις, spelled órexis, meaning 'appetite').

== Common manifestations ==
Anorexia simply manifests as a decreased or loss of appetite. This can present as not feeling hungry or lacking the desire to eat. Sometimes people do not even notice they lack an appetite until they begin to lose weight from eating less. In other cases, it can be more noticeable, such as when a person becomes nauseated from just the thought of eating. Any form of decreased appetite that leads to changes in the body (such as weight loss or muscle loss) and is not done intentionally as part of dieting is clinically significant.

== Physiology of anorexia ==
Appetite stimulation and suppression is a complex process involving many different parts of the brain and body by the use of various hormones and signals. Appetite is thought to be stimulated by interplay between peripheral signals to the brain (taste, smell, sight, gut hormones) as well as the balance of neurotransmitters and neuropeptides in the hypothalamus. Examples of these signals or hormones include neuropeptide Y, leptin, ghrelin, insulin, serotonin, and orexins (also called hypocretins). Anything that causes an imbalance of these signals or hormones can lead to the symptom of anorexia. While it is known that these signals and hormones help control appetite, the complicated mechanisms regarding a pathological increase or decrease in appetite are still being explored.

== Common causes ==
- Abdominal pain
- Acute radiation syndrome
- ADHD
- Addison's disease
- Alcoholism
- Alcohol withdrawal
- Anemia
- Anorexia nervosa
- Anxiety
- Appendicitis
- Babesiosis
- Benzodiazepine withdrawal
- Bipolar disorder
- Bronchitis
- Cancer
- Cannabinoid hyperemesis syndrome
- Cannabis withdrawal
- Celiac disease
- Chronic kidney disease
- Chronic pain
- Common cold
- Constipation
- COPD
- COVID-19
- Crohn's disease
- Cystic fibrosis
- Dehydration
- Dementia
- Depression
- Diabetes
- Ebola
- Fatty liver disease
- Fever
- Food poisoning
- Gastroparesis
- Heart failure
- Hepatitis
- HIV/AIDS
- Hypercalcemia
- Hyperglycemia
- Hypervitaminosis D
- Hypothyroidism and sometimes hyperthyroidism
- Infection
- Influenza
- Irritable bowel syndrome
- Ketoacidosis
- Kidney failure
- Low blood pressure
- Macroglossia
- Mania
- Metabolic disorders, particularly urea cycle disorders
- MELAS syndrome
- Nausea
- Old age
- Opioid use disorder
- Pancreatitis
- Pernicious anemia (vitamin B_{12} deficiency)
- Pneumonia
- Psychosis
- Salmonellosis
- Schizophrenia
- Side effect of drugs
- Stimulant use disorder
- Stomach flu
- Stress
- Sickness behavior
- Superior mesenteric artery syndrome
- Syndrome of inappropriate antidiuretic hormone secretion
- Tobacco smoking
- Tuberculosis
- Thalassemia
- Ulcerative colitis
- Uremia
- Folate deficiency
- Zinc deficiency

=== Drugs ===
- Stimulants, such as ephedrine, amphetamine, methamphetamine, MDMA, cathinone, methylphenidate, cocaine, etc.
- Hormones which are produced by adrenal glands and used as medication such as adrenaline.
- Narcotics, such as heroin, morphine, codeine, hydrocodone, oxycodone, etc.
- Antidepressants may have anorexia as a side effect, primarily selective serotonin reuptake inhibitors (SSRIs) such as fluoxetine.
- Byetta, a type II diabetes drug, will cause moderate nausea and loss of appetite.
- Abruptly stopping appetite-increasing drugs, such as cannabis and corticosteroids.
- Chemicals that are members of the phenethylamine group. (Individuals with anorexia nervosa may seek them to suppress appetite.)
- Topiramate may cause anorexia as a side effect.
- Other drugs may be used to intentionally cause anorexia in order to help a patient preoperative fasting prior to general anesthesia. It is important to avoid food before surgery to mitigate the risk of pulmonary aspiration, which can be fatal.

=== Other ===
- During the post-operative recovery period for a tonsillectomy or adenoidectomy, it is common for adult patients to experience a lack of appetite until their throat significantly heals (usually 10–14 days).
- Allergy
- Altitude sickness
- Airsickness
- Significant emotional pain caused by an event (rather than a mental disorder) can cause an individual to temporarily lose all interest in food.
- Several Twelve-step programs including Overeaters Anonymous tackle psychological issues members believe lead to forms of deprivation
- Psychological stress
- Toothache
- Experiencing grotesque, unpleasant or unappealing thoughts or conversations
- Being in the presence of unappealing things such as waste matter, dead organisms, or bad smells

== Complications ==
Complications of anorexia may result due to poor food intake. Poor food intake can lead to dehydration, electrolyte imbalances, anemia and nutritional deficiencies. These imbalances will worsen the longer that food is avoided.

=== Sudden cardiac death ===
Anorexia is a relatively common condition that can lead patients to have dangerous electrolyte imbalances, leading to acquired long QT syndrome which can result in sudden cardiac death. This can develop over a prolonged period of time, and the risk is further heightened when feeding resumes after a period of abstaining from consumption.

The proximate arrhythmic mechanism is torsades de pointes, a polymorphic ventricular tachycardia associated with QT prolongation that can degenerate into ventricular fibrillation; both hypokalemia and hypomagnesemia contribute equally to its development.

=== Refeeding syndrome ===
Care must be taken when a patient begins to eat after prolonged starvation to avoid the potentially fatal complications of refeeding syndrome. The initial signs of refeeding syndrome are minimal, but can rapidly progress to death. Thus, the reinitiation of food or oral intake is usually started slowly and requires close observation under supervision by trained healthcare professionals. This is usually done in a hospital or nutritional rehabilitation center.

== Management ==
Anorexia can be treated with the help of orexigenic drugs.
