= Pensa Custom Guitars =

American guitar manufacturer

Pensa Custom Guitars is an American company that manufactures electric guitars and basses in handmade fashion. The company is based in New York City. Pensa Custom Guitars was founded by Argentine businessman Rudy Pensa.

== History ==
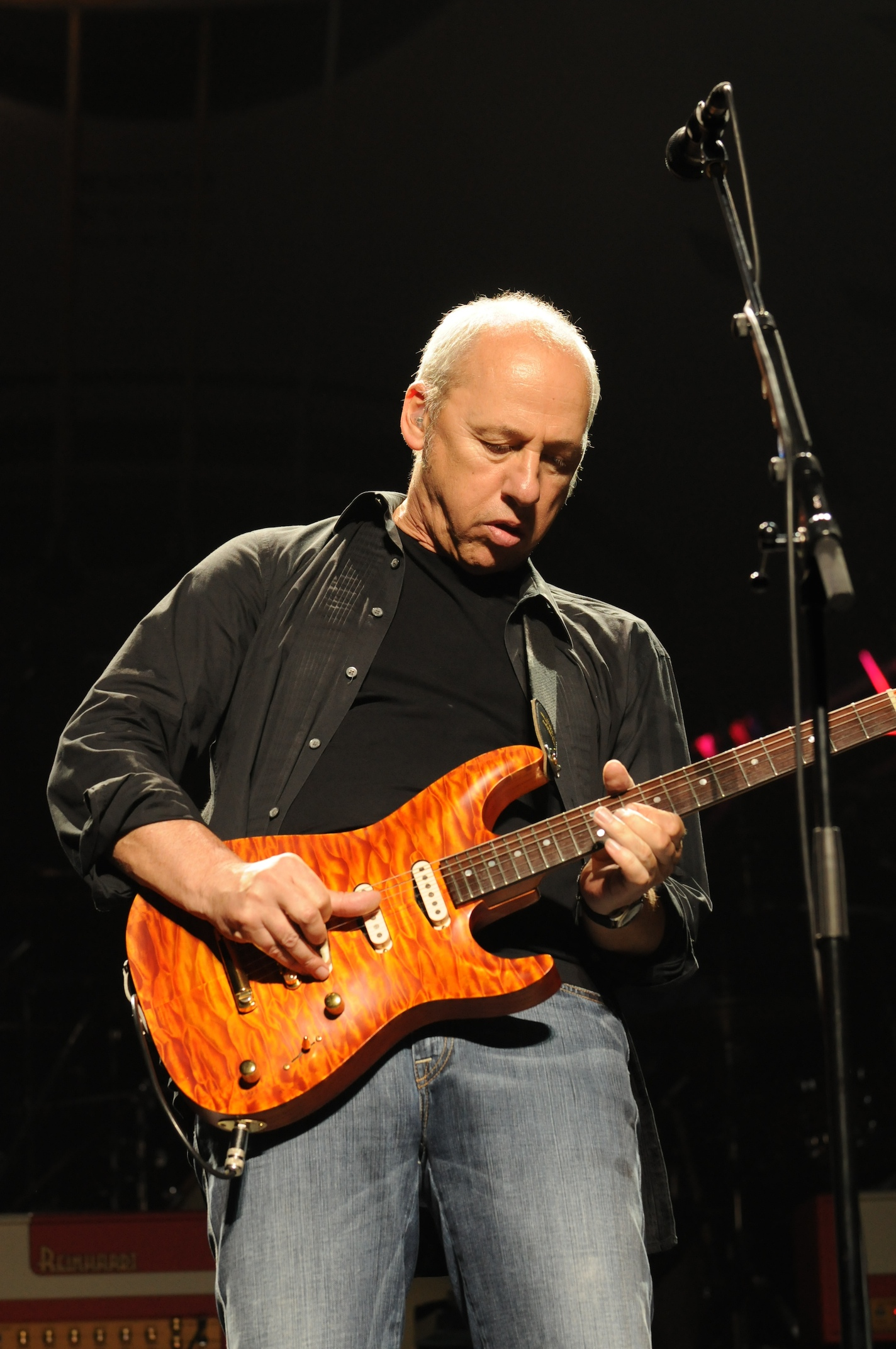
Mark Knopfler playing his custom Pensa MK-2 on tour at the NAC in Ottawa

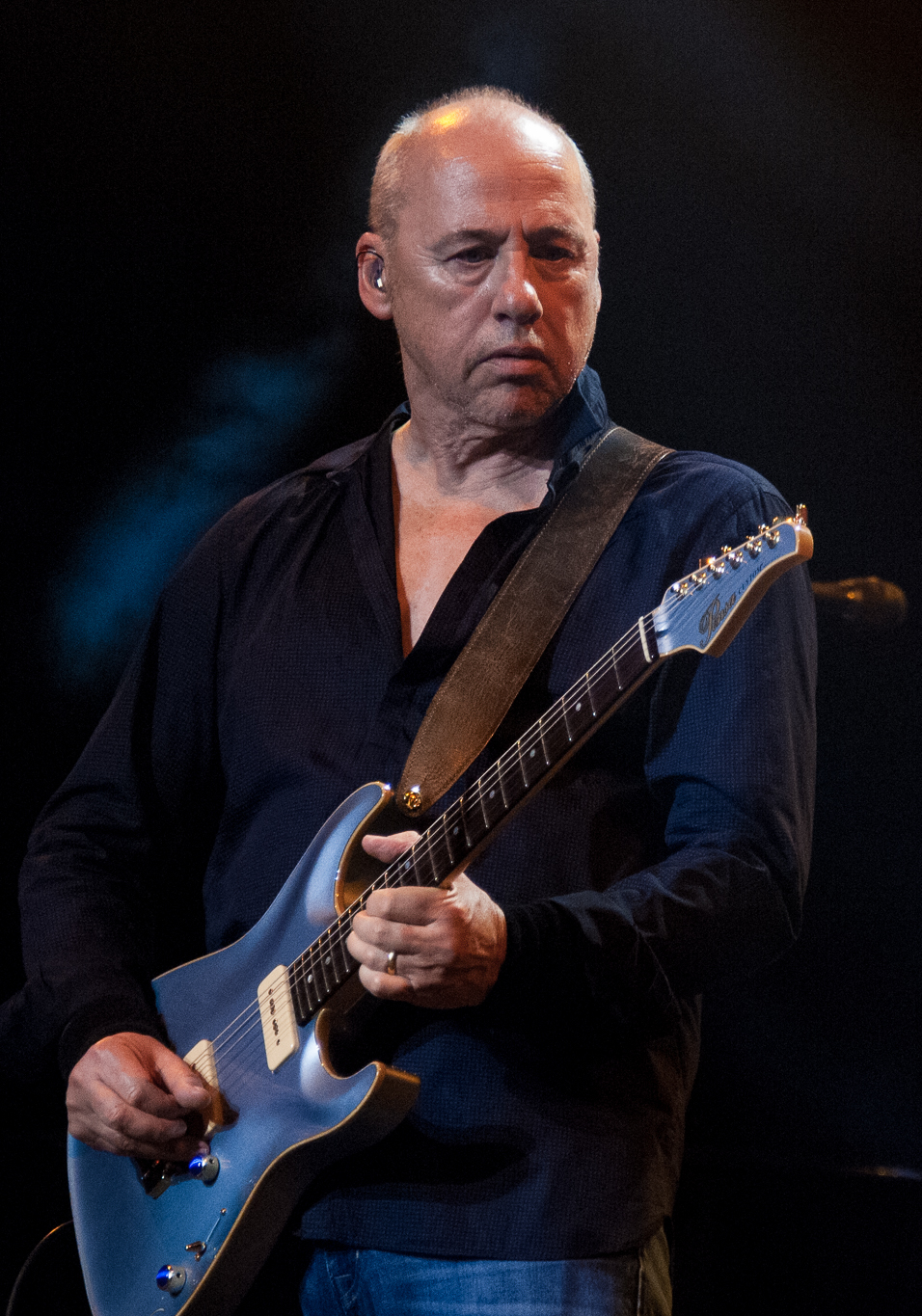
Mark Knopfler with his Pensa MK-90 blue guitar live at Le Zénith June 02nd 2015

In 1980, Mark Knopfler and Rudy Pensa met at Rudys Music Stop 48th St New York, a friendship which lasts to today. From 1984 John Suhr began creating guitars at Rudys Music Stop under the R Custom name before later building guitars carrying the Pensa-Suhr moniker. Mark Knopfler began using a number of Pensa Suhr instruments with the intention of the guitar's creation to be able to sound like both a 1961 Fender Stratocaster and a 1958 Gibson Les Paul, guitars that Knopfler played frequently on albums and on tour. Knopfler had grown tired of having to frequently switch between the Stratocaster and the Les Paul during performances, hence the need for a guitar that could sound like both. Knopfler's most famous Caramel Carve Top Pensa Suhr debuted at the 1988 Nelson Mandela concert. Some designs of the guitar were drawn on napkins at a coffee shop not far from Pensa's own place of business. Knopfler didn't like the pickup ring not matching the EMG 85 cream colour so the humbucker was mounted from the rear so a pickup ring was not needed. This served as a basis for a series of Pensa-branded handmade guitars still available from the company: the MK1 Classic Plus (bound mahogany body and neck with a 22-fret Brazilian rosewood fingerboard and carved quilted maple top, Floyd Rose locking tremolo, Gotoh tuners, black headstock, gold hardware and an active EMG pickup set with an 85 humbucking bridge pickup and two SA single-coils, master volume and master tone with switchable pull-out "presence control" mid-boost circuit); MK2 Classic (mahogany body with carved quilted maple top, Gibson scale maple neck with rosewood fingerboard, three Stratocaster single-coil pickups, studs bridge with stop tailpiece); and MK80 (Schecter Dream Machine tribute model). Knopfler would first record in the studio with the Pensa on Dire Straits' 1991 album On Every Street, and continued to use it in his shows, until he sold in on Christie's Auction in 2024.

According to the company's website, the first electric guitar created by Rudy Pensa and John Suhr was called the "R Custom", built in 1984. Pensa and Suhr built instruments together under the brand name Pensa-Suhr. The two parted ways in March 1991 when Suhr left Pensa's workshops to work for Fender as a Senior Master Builder at the Californian company's Custom Shop and established JS Technologies, Inc. with partner Steve Smith in 1997. The name Suhr was dropped from the brand name after one year for guitars subsequently built under Pensa's stewardship.

== Notable Pensa Custom players ==
- Peter Frampton
- Eric Clapton
- Mark Knopfler
- Gustavo Cerati
- Luis Alberto Spinetta
- Guillermo Vadalá
- Victor Bailey
- Lou Reed
- Christian McBride
- Pat Thrall
- Chuck Loeb
- Reb Beach
- Lenny Kravitz
- Antonio "Maca" Ramos
- Carlos Vargas
- Vlatko Stefanovski
- Pino Daniele
- Chieli Minucci
- Post Malone
- Ed King
- Randall Hall
- Bill Connors

== Current products ==
- MK1
- MK2
- MK80
- MK90
- 4-String bass
- 5-String bass
- (Guitars are also available on a build-to-order basis, based around an order form available from the Pensa Custom Guitars website).
