= Missed call =

Deliberate termination of telephone call by recipient

A missed-call icon

A missed call is a telephone call that is deliberately terminated by the caller before being answered by its intended recipient, in order to communicate a pre-agreed message. It is a form of one-bit messaging.

Missed calls were common in emerging markets where mobile phones with limited outgoing calls were widely used; as the call is not actually completed and connected, it does not carry a cost to the caller, hence they can conserve their remaining prepaid credit. Specific patterns of consecutive missed calls have been developed in some countries to denote specific messages. Missed calls are also referred to in some parts of Africa as beeping, flashing in Nigeria, a flashcall in Pakistan, miskol in the Philippines and Indonesia, and ring-cut in Sri Lanka.

Missed calls were especially prominent in India when mobile broadband and smartphones were not yet ubiquitous: expanding upon their use as a communications method, they were adopted as a form of marketing communications, in which users can "missed call" specific numbers and receive a call or text back that contains advertising and other content. Other forms of services were also built around the use of missed calls. By the mid-2010s, missed calling began to decline in popularity as access to low-cost smartphones and mobile data plans proliferated.

== Justification and impact ==
Prepaid mobile phones are popular in emerging markets, due to their lower cost in comparison to post-paid contracts. Prepaid plans have a limited number of minutes allotted for outgoing calls; as a missed call does not connect, they can be used to convey communications without consuming outgoing phone credit. Missed calls also bypass the language barrier, since they do not require voice or text to be transmitted. Indian Institute of Management Kozhikode professor of marketing management Keyoor Purani remarked that missed calls are an "economical and wide-reaching mechanism of communication."

In countries where missed calling is common, some wireless carriers showed concerns that the practice uses their networks in a manner they cannot derive revenue from. In August 2005, a Kenyan mobile operator estimated that four million missed calls were placed on their network daily. In 2006, industry estimates indicated that 20–25% of mobile calls in India were missed calls. In 2007, the Cellular Operators Association of India announced that it would conduct a study on the effects of missed calls on Indian mobile networks.

"Miskol", a Tagalog loanword for "miss call", was declared the "word of the year" at a language convention held by the University of the Philippines Diliman in 2007.

== Use cases ==
=== Social usage ===
The information communicated by a missed call is pre-agreed and contextual in nature. They are typically used to signal the sender's status, such as indicating their arrival at a specific destination, or a business informing a customer that their order is ready for pickup. In some countries, patterns have been established to indicate specific messages; in Bangladesh, two missed calls in a row is considered an indication that someone is running late, and in Syria, five missed calls in a row is considered a signal that the sender wishes to chat online. Young couples miscall one another to see if the line is free, or to intentionally keep the line busy. In Africa there are established norms for how missed calls are used, such as for indicating who should call back with a voice call (and thus, bear the responsibility of paying for it).

One-bit messaging apps such as Yo (which is only capable of sending the word "Yo" to other contacts) have been compared to the social practice of missed calls.

=== Marketing and services ===
Missed calls were adopted as a method of mobile permission marketing, known as missed call marketing (MCM). MCM campaigns take advantage of how cellular providers may offer unlimited incoming calls and text messages: advertisements contain an instruction for customers to place a missed call at a specific number. The number may be configured to automatically hang up on the caller when dialed. The number then calls or texts back with supplemental content, such as product information, offers, or sponsored celebrity messages. Advertisers can retain the phone numbers of callers to build a customer database, which could be used for future engagement and analytics.

MCM was a prominent practice in India, where it appealed to the country's cultural and economic environment: in the early-2010s, at least 90% of all cellular phone users in India were on prepaid services, feature phones were still commonplace, internet access was not widely-available in some rural regions, and there was a low market penetration for mobile broadband services. Along with advertising, missed call numbers were also used for other services, such as telephone banking, as well as program listings and viewer voting by television channels.

A number of companies specialised in MCM, including Flashcall, VivaConnect, and Zipdial. Tested during the 2010 FIFA World Cup, Zipdial was popularized by missed call services for cricket scores and Anna Hazare's anti-corruption movement; after serving over 415 million calls in its first three years of operation, the company was acquired by Twitter in 2015 for a value reported to be between US$20 and 40 million. In 2014, the social networking service Facebook announced that it would support links to missed call numbers as an ad format, as part of an effort to bolster its advertising business in emerging markets such as Brazil, India, Indonesia, and South Africa. The company partnered with Zipdial, and later VivaConnect, to offer this service. Twitter would also offer the ability for users to subscribe to SMS notifications of tweets by celebrities via missed call numbers.

In 2013, Hindustan Unilever launched Kan Khajura Tesan (Earworm Radio), a missed call service that responded with a 15-minute block of Hindi entertainment content (such as Bollywood music and devotionals), interspersed with advertising for the company's brands. Unilever intended the service to be a method of engaging consumers in markets that were underserved by media and internet communications (such as Bihar, where the service was described as being the state's most popular "radio station"); as of 2015, it had achieved 200 million impressions. Companies that are not direct competitors to Unilever were also allowed to advertise on the service; a campaign promoting the film Singham Returns through Kan Khajura Tesan generated 17 million calls. In 2014, Kan Khajura Tesan earned two gold Cannes Lions in media for "Use of Audio" and "Use of Mobile Devices", and a third in mobile for "Response/Real Time Activity". In 2015, the campaign won a bronze Lion for "Creative Effectiveness".

MCM faced criticism; Purani warned that "just as shortsighted abuse of advertising, direct mail and telemarketing has contributed to spamming-related problems, MCM runs the risk of degenerating into a marketing tool shunned by a large number of phone users." High-end brands perceived MCM as being inappropriate for targeting their target markets. Flashcall found that the concept was not viable in regions where missed calls were not an established social practice, such as the United States (where smartphones and mobile broadband were widely-available).

=== As activism ===
During the Indian anti-corruption movement in 2011, citizens could pledge support to Anna Hazare's campaign through a Zipdial number. The number received 4.5 million calls, which significantly outpaced the number of Facebook likes and Twitter retweets that the campaign's posts received online.

In January 2013, a protest was organized against high mobile internet rates in Bangladesh, in which protesters simultaneously exchanged millions of missed calls in an effort to overload the cellular network.

In 2014, India's Aam Aadmi Party used missed call numbers for a recruitment campaign. In less than a month, the line was used to recruit 700,000 new members.

On 31 January 2016, Indian Prime Minister Narendra Modi's monthly radio address Mann Ki Baat became available by phone through a missed call number. A government official stated that from 31 January to 23 February 2016, over 30 million calls were made to the number, and 20 million unique calls were returned.

=== Spam ===
Missed calls have also been used for fraudulent purposes in a scam known as "Wangiri" or "one ring and cut" (from Japanese ワン切り). A scammer leaves a missed call using an international premium rate phone number, trying to lure the recipient into calling back and thus being charged.

== Decline in popularity ==
By the 2010s, the practice of missed calling had begun to decline in India, as cheaper smartphones and mobile broadband plans became more ubiquitous. In 2014, Zipdial had been increasingly used for campaigns by e-commerce companies such as Amazon and Flipkart to advertise their mobile apps, targeting new smartphone users still familiar with missed calling. The 2016 launch of Jio—which offered competitively-priced plans and devices on a national LTE network (including coverage in both urban and rural regions), and launch offers with large amounts of free data allotments—triggered a significant growth in mobile broadband usage in the country, a price war between its established rivals, and the increased use of internet video, e-commerce, social networking services, and messaging apps.

The increasing ubiquity of smartphones prompted advertisers to shift away from missed calling, as digital and social media marketing campaigns became more viable in the market. In September 2016, Zipdial was shut down by Twitter as part of layoffs, leading to the closure of the company's engineering centre in Bangalore.

== See also ==
- Phone tag
