= The Journal of International Advanced Otology =

Peer-reviewed medical journal focused on otology

- Discipline: Otorhinolaryngology
- Language: English
- Edited by: O. Nuri Özgirgin

Publication details
- Former name: The Mediterranean Journal of Otology
- History: 2005–present
- Publisher: AVES on behalf of the European Academy of Otology and Neuro-Otology and the Politzer Society
- Frequency: Bimonthly
- Open access: Yes
- License: CC BY-NC
- Impact factor: 1.316 (2021)

Standard abbreviations
- ISO 4: J. Int. Adv. Otol.

Indexing
- ISSN: 1308-7649 (print); 2148-3817 (web)
- OCLC no.: 793085926
- The Mediterranean Journal of Otology
- ISSN: 1305-5267

Links
- Journal homepage; Online archive

The Journal of International Advanced Otology is a peer-reviewed open-access medical journal covering otology. It was established in 2005 as The Mediterranean Journal of Otology, obtaining its current title in 2009. The journal is published by AVES on behalf of the European Academy of Otology and Neuro-Otology and the Politzer Society. The editor-in-chief is O. Nuri Özgirgin (Bayındır Hospital, Ankara).

== Abstracting and indexing ==
The journal is abstracted and indexed in:

- EBSCO databases
- Index Medicus/MEDLINE/PubMed
- Science Citation Index Expanded
- Scopus

According to the Journal Citation Reports, the journal has a 2021 impact factor of 1.316.
