= One-bit message =

A one-bit message is a type of communication that has no personalized or specified content, and as such transmits only a single binary bit of information. It signals an intent and a thought, but does not specify what it is. Marc Andreessen describes "one-bit communication" as having no content other than that it exists. Examples of one-bit messages in the real world include the sound of a car horn, a police siren, and an "open" sign on a retail store. Telephone calls which are deliberately terminated before being answered are also an example of one-bit communication.

== In probability ==
One-bit messages can be used to communicate the outcome of situations with two potential outcomes, such as a coin toss.

== Online messaging ==
In the online world, one-bit messages solve a set of communication initiative problems:

- Fear of initiation: "How should I kick off the conversation? It's a daunting task."
- Fear of rejection: "What if the other person replies 'sorry, I'm in the middle of something'?"
- Fear of inconveniencing someone: "A messenger shows that the other person is available, but maybe he is actually busy."
- Fear of being ignored: "What if I message her, and she doesn't respond or goes offline immediately?"
- Topic overload: "So many topics to talk about, which one should I start with?"
- Lack of topic: "I simply want to say to my friend that I thought of her, without anything specific to say."
- Fear of a conversation of unpredictable length: "I have time for a short chat, but how do I cut it off if the conversation develops?"
- Unwillingness to type: "I'm on my mobile, and don't want to type."
- Fear of follow-up: "What if the person I message will want to meet? I don't want to meet him."

There are several platforms that enable sending one-bit messages including Yo and the Facebook poke.
