= Present (disambiguation) =

The present is a time that is neither future nor past, and is happening now, in the current moment.

Present or The Present or Presents may also refer to:

- Gift, something given free of charge, gratis

== Time and timing ==
- Present tense, a grammatical tense of a verb
- Before Present, radiocarbon dates relative to AD 1950
- Presenting, a medical term
- Presenteeism, meaning working while sick
- Voting "present", a form of abstention in parliamentary procedure

== Film and television ==
- The Present, a 2009 surf film by Thomas Campbell
- The Present (2014 film), a German animated short film by Jacob Frey
- The Present (2020 film), a Palestinian short film by Farah Nabulsi
- The Present (2024 film), an American comedy film by Christian Ditter
- "The Present" (The Flash), an episode of The Flash
- "The Present", a 2015 episode of Minority Report
- "Present", a 2022 episode of Staged

== Print media ==
- Present, a 1997 poetry collection by Alfred Corn
- The Present, a 1975 novel by Gabriel Josipovici
- The Present, a 1998 romance novel by Johanna Lindsey
- The Present: The Secret to Enjoying Your Work And Life, Now!, self help book by Spencer Johnson
- Présent, a French right-wing newspaper

== Music ==
- The Present, a New York-based duo featuring Mina Ohashi, who previously performed under the name Fayray
- Present (band), a Belgian progressive rock group
- "The Present", a 2024 holiday-themed single by Forrest Frank

=== Albums ===
- Present (Bonnie Pink album), 2003
- Present (Killing Heidi album), 2002
- Present (Sun Electric album), 1996
- Present (Super Junior-D&E EP), 2015
- Present (Timbaland & Magoo album), 2005
- Present (Van der Graaf Generator album), 2005
- Present (Yuki Uchida album), 1997
- Present – The Very Best of Steeleye Span, 2002
- Present, a 2013 album by CNBLUE
- Present, a 2020 album by Frans Jeppsson Wall
- Present, a 2018 EP by HNB (band) as Woo Jin-young X Kim Hyun-soo
- Present, a 2007 album by Park Yong-ha
- Present, a 1997 album by Sass Jordan
- Present, a 2011 album by Japanese singer Shizuka Itō
- Present, a 1997 album by Toy (South Korean band)
- Present, a 2018 album by South Korean singers Woo Jin-young and Kim Hyun-soo
- Present, a 1987 album by Yui Asaka
- Present, a 2015 album by Yukiko Okada
- The Present (Moody Blues album), 1983
- Presents (Maki Ohguro album), 2002
- Presents (Princess Princess album), 1994
- Presents, a 1998 album by My Little Lover
- Presents, a 2007 album by 10 Foot Ganja Plant

=== Songs ===
- Present (Chris Brown song), on Brown, 2026
- Present (Khalid song), on Scenic Drive (mixtape), 2021
- "Present", a 2008 song by Bump of Chicken from Present from You
- "Present", an English-language version of the 2011 Eurovision contest entry "Jestem" Magdalena Tul's
- "Present", a 2018 song by Gen Hoshino from Pop Virus
- "Present", a 2020 song by Mrs. Green Apple
- "Presents", instrumental by Tom Waits from One from the Heart

== Other uses ==
- Present (Aitken) a sculpture in Washington, D.C, by Robert Ingersoll Aitken
- PRESENT (cipher), an ultra-lightweight block cipher algorithm
- The Present, a 2015 stage adaptation of Anton Chekhov's play Platonov, brought to Broadway in 2016

== See also ==
- Presenter (disambiguation)
- Presence (disambiguation)
- Presentation (disambiguation)
- Gift (disambiguation)
- Now (disambiguation)
