= Lunga (surname) =

Lunga is a Zimbabwean surname. Notable people with the surname include:

- Divine Lunga, a Zimbabwean footballer
- Gift Lunga, a Zimbabwean footballer
- Precious Lunga, a Zimbabwean epidemiologist and entrepreneur

== See also ==
- Lunga (disambiguation)
