= Cambridge Semantics =

- Type: Private
- Industry: Computer software
- Founded: 2007; 19 years ago
- Founder: Sean Martin; Lee Feigenbaum; Simon Martin; Emmett Eldred; Ben Szekely
- Headquarters: Boston, Massachusetts, United States
- Key people: Chuck Pieper (chairman and CEO); Alok Prasad (president)
- Website: cambridgesemantics.com

Cambridge Semantics is a privately held company headquartered in Boston, Massachusetts with an office in San Diego, California. The company is an enterprise big data management and exploratory analytics software company.

== History ==
Cambridge Semantics was founded in 2007 by Sean Martin, Lee Feigenbaum, Simon Martin, Rouben Meschian, Ben Szekely and Emmett Eldred who all previously worked at IBM's Advanced Technology Internet Group.

In 2012, Cambridge Semantics appointed Chuck Pieper as chief executive. Pieper was previously at Credit Suisse.

In January 2016, Cambridge Semantics acquired SPARQL City and its graph database intellectual property.

On April 18, 2024, Altair Engineering acquired Cambridge Semantics.

On 26 March 2025, Siemens announced the acquisition of Altair.

== Products ==
- Anzo Smart Data Lake uses Semantic Web Technologies. It allows IT departments and their business users to access data.
- AnzoGraph DB Graph database. AnzoGraph DB is a massively parallel processing (MPP) native graph database built for diverse data harmonization and analytics at scale (trillions of triples and more), speed and deep link insights. It is used for embedded analytics that require graph algorithms, graph views, named queries, aggregates, geospatial, built-in data science functions, data warehouse-style BI and reporting functions. It allows users to load and query RDF data using SPARQL or Cypher for OLAP-style analytics.

== Marketing ==
- Cambridge Semantics named SIIA Codie award 2018 finalist.
- Cambridge Semantics named 2018 Gold Stevie Award Winner for 'Big Data Solutions'.
- Cambridge Semantics named KMWorld’s 2018 ‘100 Companies That Matter in Knowledge Management’.
- Cambridge Semantics named to Database Trends and Applications' 'Trend-Setting Products in Data and Information Management for 2018'.
- Cambridge Semantics named to KMWorld Trend-Setting Products of 2017.
- Cambridge Semantics named to Database Trends and Applications 'DBTA 100: The Companies That Matter Most in Data'.
- Cambridge Semantics named SIIA Codie award 2017 winner for ‘Best Text Analytics and Semantic Technology Solution’.
- Cambridge Semantics named 2017 Silver Stevie Award Winner for 'Big Data Solutions'.
- Cambridge Semantics named KMWorld’s 2017 ‘100 Companies That Matter in Knowledge Management’.
- Cambridge Semantics named SIIA Codie award 2016 finalist.
- Cambridge Semantics named KMWorld’s 2016 ‘100 Companies That Matter in Knowledge Management’ and KMWorld Trend-Setting Products of 2015.
- Cambridge Semantics named 2016 Bio-IT World Best of Show People's Choice Award Contenders and 2015 Bio-IT best of show finalist.
- Anzo Insider Trading Investigation and Surveillance named 2015 CODiE Award finalist.
- Cambridge Semantics Selected as Finalist for 2014 MIT Sloan CIO Symposium's Innovation Showcase.
- Cambridge Semantics named SIIA CODiE Award 2014 finalist.
- Cambridge Semantics Win 2013 SIIA CODiE Award for best business intelligence and analytics solution.
- Cambridge Semantics wins KMWorld 2012 Promise Award.
- Cambridge Semantics wins Best of Show at 2012 Bio-IT World Conference.
