= Presence =

Presence may refer to:

== Arts, entertainment and media ==
=== Film and television ===
- Presence (1993 film), a Russian drama
- Presence (2024 film), an American psychological thriller
- Witchtrap, or The Presence, a 1989 American horror film
- Danger Island, or The Presence, a 1992 American made-for-TV film
- The Presence (film), a 2010 American horror film
- "Presence", a short film in the anthology anime Robot Carnival
- "Presence", a TV episode of NewsRadio season 2

=== Literature ===
- The Presence (DC Comics), a fictional character
- Presence (Marvel Comics), or Sergei Krylov, a fictional character
- Presence: Teleoperators & Virtual Environments, an academic journal
- The Presence: A Ghost Story, a 2003 children's ghost novel by Eve Bunting
- The Presence, a 2010 novel by Paul Black

=== Music ===
- Presence (band), a 1990 British rock band
- Presence (USA), a 1999 Tallahassee Rock Band
- Presence (album), by Led Zeppelin, 1976
- Presence, a 2017 album by Petit Biscuit
- "Presence", a song by Brittany Howard from the 2019 album Jaime

=== Theatre ===
- Presence (play), by David Harrower, 2001

== Science and technology ==
- Presence (sound recording), or room tone
- Presence (amplification), boosts the upper mid-range frequencies
- Presence (telepresence), a theoretical concept about media representation
- Presence, enabling people to interact with the world outside their physical bodies via immersion (virtual reality)

== See also ==
- Present (disambiguation)
- Presence information, indicating availability of people on a telecommunications network
- Distributed presence, a digital marketing term
- Divine presence, a concept in religion, spirituality, and theology
- Existence, which may be considered the presence of something
- Web presence, the appearance of a person or organization on the World Wide Web
- Metaphysics of presence, a view held by Martin Heidegger
- Presencia de América Latina, a mural by Jorge González Camarena
- Real presence of Christ in the Eucharist
