= The Gift =

The Gift(s) may refer to:

== Literature ==
=== Nonfiction and anthologies ===
- The Gift (essay), a 1925 sociology/anthropology essay by Marcel Mauss
- The Gift: Imagination and the Erotic Life of Property, a 1983 book by Lewis Hyde
- The Gift, a c. 1941–1943 memoir by H.D.
- The Gift, a 19th-century annual gift book edited by Eliza Leslie

=== Fiction ===
- The Gift (Croggon novel), 2002, by Alison Croggon
- The Gift (Nabokov novel), 1938, by Vladimir Nabokov
- The Gift (Steel novel), 1994, by Danielle Steel
- The Gift, a 2008 novel by Cecelia Ahern
- The Gift, a 1973 novel by Peter Dickinson
- The Gift, a 1992 novel by Kirk Douglas
- The Gift, a 2007 novel by Richard Paul Evans
- The Gift, a 2004 novel by David Flusfeder
- The Gift, a 1973 novel by Pete Hamill
- The Gift, a 1998 novel by Patrick O'Leary

== Film and television ==
=== Films ===
- The Gifts, a 1970 American documentary short
- The Gift (1979 film), an American TV film
- The Gift (1982 film) (French: Le Cadeau), or Bankers Also Have Souls, a French/Italian comedy
- The Gift (1994 film), an American TV short film directed by Laura Dern
- The Gift, a 1998 British TV film featuring Amanda Burton
- The Gift (2000 film), an American supernatural suspense film starring Cate Blanchett and directed by Sam Raimi
- The Gift (2003 film), an American documentary by Louise Hogarth
- The Gift (2009 film), or Echelon Conspiracy, an American action thriller
- The Gift, a 2010 film featuring Jamie Hector
- The Gift (2014 film), an Irish thriller
- The Gift (2015 American film), a thriller starring Jason Bateman and directed by Joel Edgerton
- The Gift (2015 Scottish film), a short film
- The Gift, a 2016 Japanese animated short by Marza Animation Planet

=== Television ===
==== Episodes ====
- "The Gift" (The Amazing World of Gumball), 2015
- "The Gift" (Bonanza), 1961
- "The Gift" (Buffy the Vampire Slayer), 2001
- "The Gift" (Dilbert), 1999
- "The Gift" (FlashForward), 2009
- "The Gift" (Game of Thrones), 2015
- "The Gift" (Gideon's Crossing), 2000
- "The Gift" (Gimme a Break!), 1985
- "The Gift" (The Jeffersons), 1984
- "The Gift" (Law & Order: Criminal Intent), 2003
- "The Gift" (Matlock), 1987
- "The Gift" (Mike Tyson Mysteries), 2018
- "The Gift" (The New Adventures of He-Man), 1990
- "The Gift" (The Sarah Jane Adventures), 2009
- "The Gift" (Saved by the Bell), 1989
- "The Gift" (Star Trek: Voyager), 1997
- "The Gift" (Stargate Atlantis), 2005
- "The Gift" (Starman), 1986
- "The Gift" (Three's Company), 1978
- "The Gift" (The Twilight Zone), 1962
- "The Gift" (The Waltons), 1974
- "The Gift" (The X-Files), 2001
- "The Gift", an episode of Challenge of the GoBots

==== Series ====
- The Gift (British TV series), a 1990 series featuring Jeff Rawle
- The Gift (1997 TV series), an Australian children's series
- The Gift (2013 TV series), a Philippine drama series
- The Gift (2007 TV program), an Australian medical documentary program
- The Gift (2019 Philippine TV series), a drama series
- The Gift (Turkish TV series), a 2019 fantasy drama series

==== Plays ====
- The Gift (The Play on One), a 1989 British television play by Colin MacDonald
- The Gift (audio drama), an audio play based on the series Doctor Who

== Music ==
=== Bands ===
- The Gift (band), a Portuguese pop/rock band
- From the Jam, originally The Gift, an English band

=== Albums ===
- The Gift (Andre Nickatina album) or the title song, 2005
- The Gift (Bizzy Bone album), 2001
- The Gift (Big Mello album), 2002
- The Gift (Bullet LaVolta album), 1989
- The Gift (Charles Moffett album) or the title song, 1969
- The Gift (David "Fathead" Newman album) or the title song, 2003
- The Gift (The Jam album) or the title song, 1982
- The Gift (Joe Louis Walker album) or the title song, 1988
- The Gift (John Zorn album), 2001
- The Gift (Kenny Rogers album), 1996
- The Gift (Master P album), 2013
- The Gift (Midge Ure album) or the title song, 1985
- The Gift (Susan Boyle album), 2010
- The Lion King: The Gift, by Beyoncé, 2019
- The Gift (EP), by Pia Mia, 2013
- The Gift, by Corrinne May, 2006
- The Gift, by Jim Brickman, or the title song (see below), 1997
- The Gift, by Larry Carlton, 1996
- The Gift, a tribute album of the songs of Ian Tyson, 2007

=== Songs ===
- "The Gift" (Bro'Sis song), a cover of the 98 Degrees song "This Gift", 2002
- "The Gift" (Celine Dion song), 2023
- "The Gift" (INXS song), 1993
- "The Gift" (Jim Brickman song), 1997
- "The Gift" (The McCarters song), 1988
- "The Gift" (Seether song), 2006
- "The Gift" (The Velvet Underground song), 1968
- "The Gift" (Way Out West song), 1996
- "The Gift", by Angels & Airwaves from We Don't Need to Whisper, 2006
- "The Gift", by Annie Lennox from Diva, 1992
- "The Gift", by Five Bolt Main from Venting, 2005
- "The Gift", by Eric Prydz from Eric Prydz Presents Pryda, 2012
- "The Gift", by Garth Brooks from Beyond the Season, 1992
- "The Gift", by the Sidemen, 2019
- "The Gift", by Slapshock from Novena, 2004
- "The Gift", by Tony Banks from Still, 1991

== Art ==
- The Gift (sculpture), a 1921 readymade by Man Ray

== See also ==
- Gift (disambiguation)
- Present (disambiguation)
