= Lungești (disambiguation) =

Lungești may refer to several places in Romania:

- Lungești, a commune located in Vâlcea County
- Lungești, a village in Cozieni Commune, Buzău County
- Lungești, a village in Iara Commune, Cluj County
- Lungești, a village in Bălăbăneşti Commune, Galați County

== See also ==
- Lunga (disambiguation)
