= Zimbabwe Grounds =

Sports venue in Harare, Zimbabwe

Coordinates: 17°53′18.8″S 30°59′31.4″E

The Zimbabwe grounds are an area within Highfield Suburb on the south of Zimbabwe's Capital, Harare. It is surrounded by Old Highfield section on the greater part and share borders with Takashinga cricket ground (home ground of Andy Flower and Tatenda Taibu), Zimbabwe Hall, Highfield Library, a Nursery School, Anglican Church and Chipembere Primary School annexe. The grounds are within a stone's throw of Gwanzura football stadium.

These grounds normally stage the Makomva League social soccer games on Saturdays, Sundays and Public holidays. The tennis and basketball are open to the public and admission is free for every event.

The Zimbabwe Grounds are famous for having hosted Robert Mugabe's ZANU party's "Star Rally" in 1980. It is at this meeting that he made his famous prediction for a landslide victory at the impending Commonwealth-supervised elections, the first in which ZANU would be participating. As Mugabe had predicted, ZANU won; he has been at the helm of the Zimbabwean government ever since.

The Zimbabwe Grounds were the scene of widespread chaos and violence on March 11, 2007. This occurred after opposition members, church members, national constitutional members, and the general public gathered for a 'prayer meeting, to protest against the death of democracy and general hardships in Zimbabwe' The government of Zimbabwe of Robert Mugabe viewed this gathering as a severe case of civil disobedience. It perceived this gathering as pilot for a 'revolution'. The government responded with a heavy hand in their efforts to disperse the gatherers. This clashes resulted in the fatal shooting of Gift Tandare an MDC activist as police resorted to using live ammunition against the masses.
