= Gift of Gab =

Gift of the Gab may refer to:

- Eloquence, fluent, elegant or persuasive speaking
- "The Gift of Gab" (short story), a 1955 short story by Jack Vance
- Gift of Gab (film), a black-and-white film released in 1934 by Universal Pictures
- Gift of Gab (rapper), American musician, member of Blackalicious
- Irish legend of the Blarney Stone
- The Gift of Gab (album), a 2018 studio album by E-40
