= Fabio Coala =

Brazilian comics artist

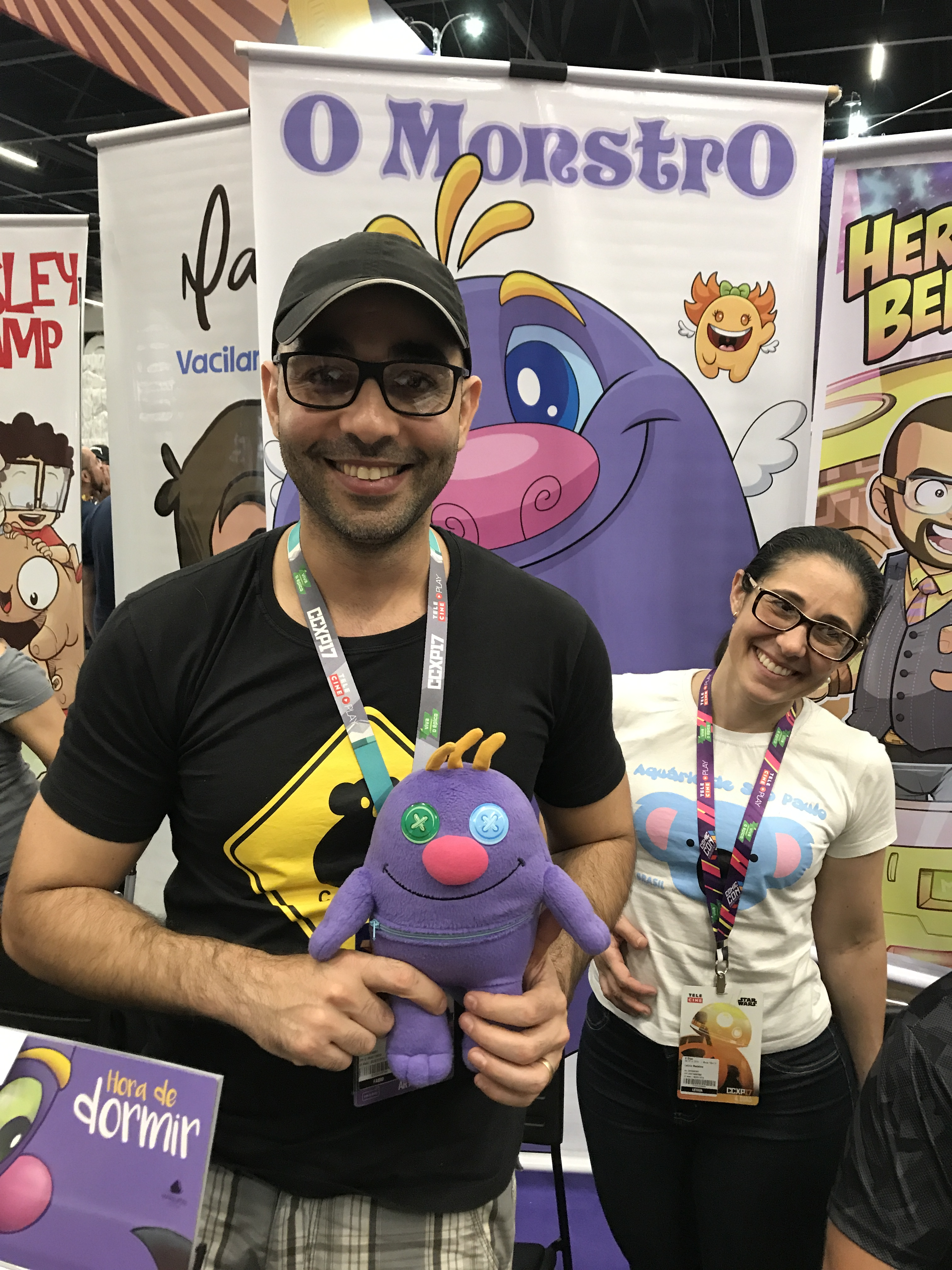
- Fabio Coala and his wife
- Born: 20 July 1978 (age 48)
- Area: Cartoonist
- Notable works: Mentirinhas
- Awards: Prêmio Al Rio for National Outstanding (2018); Troféu HQ Mix (2014)

Fabio Coala is a Brazilian comics artist. After five years of working as a firefighter, he created the website Mentirinhas ("Little Lies") in which he publishes, starting in 2010, webcomics with different characters. One of the main characters is "O Monstro" ("The Monster"), a toy monster that helps children with problems by becoming a real monster for them. The first Monster's printed graphic novel was released in 2013 after a successful crowdfunding campaign and, in the following year, the book won the Troféu HQ Mix (most important Brazilian comic related award) in the category "Best Independent Publication". A Coala's comic strip called "Perfeição" ("Perfection") was also adapted in 2014 as a short animated movie by Jacob Frey and Markus Kranzler. The movie, called The Present, has won 77 awards from several film festivals and has garnered critical acclaim.
