= Presentity =

Refers to an entity that has presence information associated with it

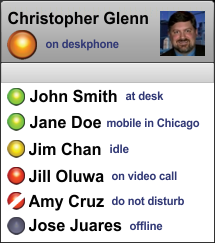
Example of Presence Information

The term presentity is a combination of two words - "presence" and "entity". It basically refers to an entity that has presence information associated with it; information such as status, reachability, and willingness to communicate.

== Usage ==
The term presentity is often used to refer to users who post and update their presence information through some kind of presence applications on their devices. In this case presence information describes availability and willingness of this user to communicate via set of communication services. For example, users of an instant messaging service (such as ICQ or MSN Messenger) are presentities and their presence information is their user status (online, offline, away, etc.). Presentity can also refer to a resource or role such as a conference room or help desk.

A presentity can also refer to a group of users, for example a collection of customer service agents in a call center. This presentity may be considered available if there is at least one agent ready to accept a call.
