= Lunga =

Lunga may refer to:

== Places ==
Democratic Republic of Congo

- Lunga, DRC, a town located in Katanga Province

Moldova

- Lunga, Florești, a commune in Floreşti district
- Lunga, Transnistria, a commune in Transnistria

Romania

- Lunga, a village in Târgu Secuiesc city, Covasna County
- Lunga, a village in Comloșu Mare Commune, Timiș County
- Lunga, a tributary of the Cheia in Vâlcea County
- Lunga, a tributary of the Bistricioara in Vâlcea County

Scotland

- Lunga, Firth of Lorn, one of the Slate Islands in Argyll and Bute
- Lunga, Treshnish Isles, in Argyll and Bute

Solomon Islands

- Lunga Point, an area on Guadalcanal
- Lunga River (Solomon Islands)

United States

- Lunga Reservoir and Lunga Park Recreation Area, Marine Corps Base Quantico, Virginia

Zambia

- Lunga River (Zambia), two tributaries of the Zambezi

== Other uses ==
- Lunga (surname), a list of people with surname Lunga
- Lunga, also lunga pausa, used in music notation above a fermata to extend its length
- LungA Art Festival, Iceland
- LungA School, an art school in Iceland

== See also ==
- Lunga Lunga, a settlement in Kenya
- Lungalunga language, spoken in Papua New Guinea
- USS Lunga Point (CVE-94)
