= Speech Technology (magazine) =

- Editor: Leonard Klie
- Categories: Technology, voice recognition, news
- Frequency: Quarterly
- Founded: 1995
- Company: Information Today, Inc.
- Country: United States
- Based in: Medford, New Jersey
- Language: English
- Website: www.speechtechmag.com
- ISSN: 1088-5803

Speech Technology is a magazine published four times a year by Information Today, Inc. The magazine discusses deployments, advances and other industry news in its magazine and on its website. Its headquarters is in Medford, New Jersey.

In addition, each year Speech Technology hosts the largest educational speech technology conference in the United States. SpeechTEK is attended by technology professionals from around the globe.

== History ==
Speech Technology magazine was founded in 1995 at the first SpeechTEK developers conference in Boston, with the goal of reporting on the then-nascent speech industry. It was purchased in 2006 by Information Today, Inc., a 29-year-old, Medford-based integrated media company specializing in magazines, periodicals, books, websites, and conferences serving the information marketplace.

== Awards ==
In 2008, Speech Technology received an APEX award for publication excellence.
