= Frédéric Barlat =

French-American material scientist (born 1957)

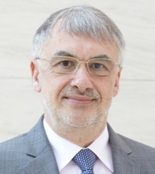
- Born: April 7, 1957 (age 69); Barbezieux
- Occupation: Scientist
- Children: Mathias Barlat, Ermantine Berkowitz
- Parent(s): Jean Barlat, Josette Barlat

== Biography ==
Professor Frédéric Barlat is a French/American scientist in the field of plasticity, damage and metal forming. He is currently the director of A&S Center at Graduate Institute of Ferrous Technology at Pohang University of Science and Technology (POSTECH University) in South Korea. Professor Barlat's contribution in the field of plasticity, particularly his models on anisotropic plasticity of metallic materials, has been recognized worldwide.

Professor Frédéric Barlat finished his undergraduate and master's degree at Ecole Nationale Supérieure d’Arts et Métiers, France in 1980. He finished his PhD in mechanical engineering from Grenoble Institute of Technology in France in 1984. Immediately after finishing his PhD he started his career as a researcher associate at Alcoa Technical Center in Pittsburgh, US. In 1986 he became an assistant professor at Grenoble Institute of Technology in France. After one year he returned to Alcoa research center as a senior engineer, where he worked for 20 years. In 2007, he joined Pohang University of Science and Technology in South Korea as a professor.

== Constitutive models ==
Professor Frédéric Barlat is highly recognized in the plasticity, damage, and metal forming communities. He has innovated and developed several brilliant constitutive models for anisotropic plasticity of metallic materials including:
- A family of Barlat's yield criteria:

- Barlat's 89 model: Plastic behavior and stretchability of sheet metals. Part I: A yield function for orthotropic sheets under plane stress conditions;
- Barlat's 91 model: A six-component yield function for anisotropic materials;
- Yld2000-2D: Plane stress yield function for aluminum alloy sheets;
- Yld2004-18p: Linear transformation-based anisotropic yield functions;

- Barlat's constitutive model for non-isotropic hardening (cyclic loading) of metallic materials:

- Homogeneous-Anisotropic-Hardening (HAH) model: An alternative to kinematic hardening in classical plasticity

== Awards ==
Because of his lifelong outstanding achievements in the field of plasticity, damage and metal forming, Prof. Barlat has been awarded worldwide:

- In 2016 he became an honorary member of Romanian Academy
- In 2013 he received the Khan Plasticity Award
- In 2011 Chinese Academy of Sciences presented him the Lee Hsun Lecture Award
- In 2006 he received the International Journal of Plasticity Awards
- In 1995 he received the ASM Henry Marion Howe Medal of the Material Society

== Research topics ==
Frederic Barlat is actively working on the following subjects:

- Advanced material characterization and forming processes
- Meso- and macro-scale constitutive modeling of plasticity
- Numerical simulations of forming processes

== Teaching ==
The following courses are given by Frederic Barlat at the Graduate Institute of Ferrous Technology:

- Plasticity and Forming
- Ductile and Brittle Fracture
- Experimental Mechanics

== Mentorship ==
Professor Barlat has directly supervised several graduate students since he joined the Graduate Institute of Ferrous Technology. Here is the list of completed projects:

- 2010:
1. Crystal Plasticity Application to 304 Austenitic Stainless Steel (MSc. thesis: Jeong Young Ung)
2. Behavior of Dual Phase steels in Stretch Bending (MSc. thesis: Moon Jung Myung)
3. Effect of Strain Rate Sensitivity on Formability of Stainless Steel 409L (MSc. thesis: Kim Chang Su)
4. Application of Convected Coordinate Systems for Yield functions (MSc. thesis: Lee Jinwoo)
5. Bauschinger effect in simple shear for DQIF and DP steel sheets (MSc. thesis: Kim Hyo Jung)
- 2011:
1. Constitutive Modeling of High Strength Steel Sheets (PhD dissertation: Le Xu)
2. Determination and Modeling of the Forming Limit Diagram for thin Ferritic Stainless Steel Sheet(MSc. thesis: Bong Hyuk Jong)
- 2012:
1. Nonlinear Behavior of Steel Sheets during Unloading and Reloading (MSc. thesis: Kim Hyun Jin)
- 2013:
1. Analysis of Hot Press Formed Parts with Tailored Strength (PhD dissertation: Choi Jong Won)
2. Frictional Behaviors of a TRIP780 and a Mild Steel under a wide range of Contact Stresses and at various Sliding Velocity (MSc. thesis: Lee Jeong Uk)
3. Simple shear flow behavior for Advanced High Strength Steel (AHSS) sheets (MSc. thesis: Choi Ji Sik)
- 2014:
1. Application of self-consistent crystal plasticity framework as a constitutive description for commercial steel sheets (PhD dissertation: Jeong Young Ung)
2. Finite Element Analysis in Sheet Metal Forming of Advanced High Strength Steels (PhD dissertation: Lee Jinwoo)
3. Simulations of Hot Press Forming with Advanced Thermo-Mechanical-Metallurgical Finite Element Modeling (PhD dissertation: Bok Hyun Ho)
4. Advanced experiments for the AHSS (MSc. thesis: Seo Ju Won)
- 2015:
1. Effects of Plastic Strain, Arc welding and Tempering on Fatigue Property of Automotive Hot Rolled Steels (PhD dissertation: Kwon Hyuk Sun)
2. Forming of Ultra-Thin Ferritic Stainless Steel Sheets (PhD dissertation: Bong Hyuk Jong)
3. Constitutive and Friction Modeling for Robust Springback Prediction of Advanced High Strength Steel Sheets (PhD dissertation: Lee Jeong Yeon)
4. Crystal Plasticity Investigation of Ridging Mechanisms in Ferritic Stainless Steels (PhD dissertation: Chung Yang Jin)
5. Enhanced Formability of AHSS Using a Non-conventional Forming Approach (PhD dissertation: Omid Majidi)
6. Reverse loading parameter determination for ultrathin steel sheets (MSc. thesis: Choi Jae Hyun)
- 2016:
1. Transformation Kinetics and Density Models of Q&P Steel for Potential Press-Hardening Applications (PhD dissertation: Kim Seok Nyeon)
2. Macro- and Meso-scopic Finite Element Modeling of Strain Path-Induced Plastic Anisotropy Evolution in Steel Sheet (PhD dissertation: Ha Jin Jin)
3. Heat Transfer Coefficient Calculations between Tool and Boron Steel Blanks for HPF (MSc. thesis: Kim Hak Rae)
4. Application of the Virtual Fields Method to High Strain Rate Testing (MSc. thesis: Lim Do Hyun)
5. Evaluation of Anisotropic Yield Function for Hole Expansion Test of DP and BH Steel Sheets (MSc. thesis: Zadi Maad Ahmad)
- 2017:
1. Springback Prediction of AHSS Sheets in Double-stage Forming Using Advanced Constitutive Modeling (PhD dissertation: Choi Ji Sik)
2. Modeling of Yield Surface Evolution in Uniaxial and Biaxial Loading Conditions Using a Pre-strained Large-scale Specimen (MSc. thesis: Shakil Bin Zaman)
3. Characterization of Fracture in Medium Mn Steel (MSc. thesis: Choi Hong Ki)
4. Characterization of Fracture in TRIP1180 (MSc. thesis: Choi Won Seok)
- 2018:
1. Effect of Rolling Parameters on Surface Strain Variation in Hot Strip Rolling (PhD dissertation: Kim Kyung Seok)
2. Characterization of Dynamic Hardening Behavior at Intermediate Strain Rates Using the Virtual Field Method (MSc. thesis: Park Jin Seong)
3. A Crystal Plasticity Model for Describing the Anisotropic Hardening Behavior of Steel Sheets during Strain-Path Changes (PhD dissertation: Kim Hwi Geon)
- 2019:
1. Finite Element Modeling for Ultrathin and Thick Steel Sheets (PhD dissertation: Choi Jae Hyun)
2. Validation of HAH model Using Non-linear Strain Path Experiments (MSc. thesis: Lee Shin Yeong)
3. Yield Surface Modeling by Non-linear Strain Path Experiments (MSc. thesis: Asif bin Zaman)
- 2020:
1. Identification of Dynamic Properties using Acceleration by the Virtual Fields Method (MSc. thesis: Kim Ji Min)
2. Application of HAH Model in Simple Shear Cycles at Large Accumulated Strain (MSc. thesis: Luhur Anggito Wicaksono)
