= Speech technology =

Speech technology relates to the technologies designed to duplicate and respond to the human voice. They have many uses. These include aid to the voice-disabled, the hearing-disabled, and the blind, along with communication with computers without a keyboard. They enhance game software and aid in marketing goods or services by telephone.

The subject includes several subfields:

- Speech synthesis
- Speech recognition
- Speaker recognition
- Speaker verification
- Speech encoding
- Multimodal interaction

== See also ==
- Communication aids
- Language technology
- Speech interface guideline
- Speech processing
- Speech Technology (magazine)
