= Speech enhancement =

Speech enhancement or dialogue enhancement aims to improve speech quality by using various algorithms. The objective of enhancement is improvement in intelligibility and/or overall perceptual quality of degraded speech signal using audio signal processing techniques.

Enhancing of speech degraded by noise, or noise reduction, is the most important field of speech enhancement, and used for many applications such as mobile phones, VoIP, teleconferencing systems, speech recognition, speaker diarization, hearing aids, as well as TV shows and TV dramas playback.

== Algorithms ==
The algorithms of speech enhancement for noise reduction can be categorized into three fundamental classes: filtering techniques, spectral restoration, and model-based methods.

- Filtering Techniques

- Spectral Subtraction Method
- Wiener Filtering
- Signal subspace approach (SSA)

- Spectral Restoration

- Minimum Mean-Square-Error Short-Time, Spectral Amplitude Estimator (MMSE-STSA)

- Speech-Model-Based

== See also ==
- Audio noise reduction
- Speech coding
- Speech interface guideline
- Speech processing
- Speech recognition
- Voice analysis
