= O2 wireless box =

Wireless residential gateway router

O2 Wireless Box
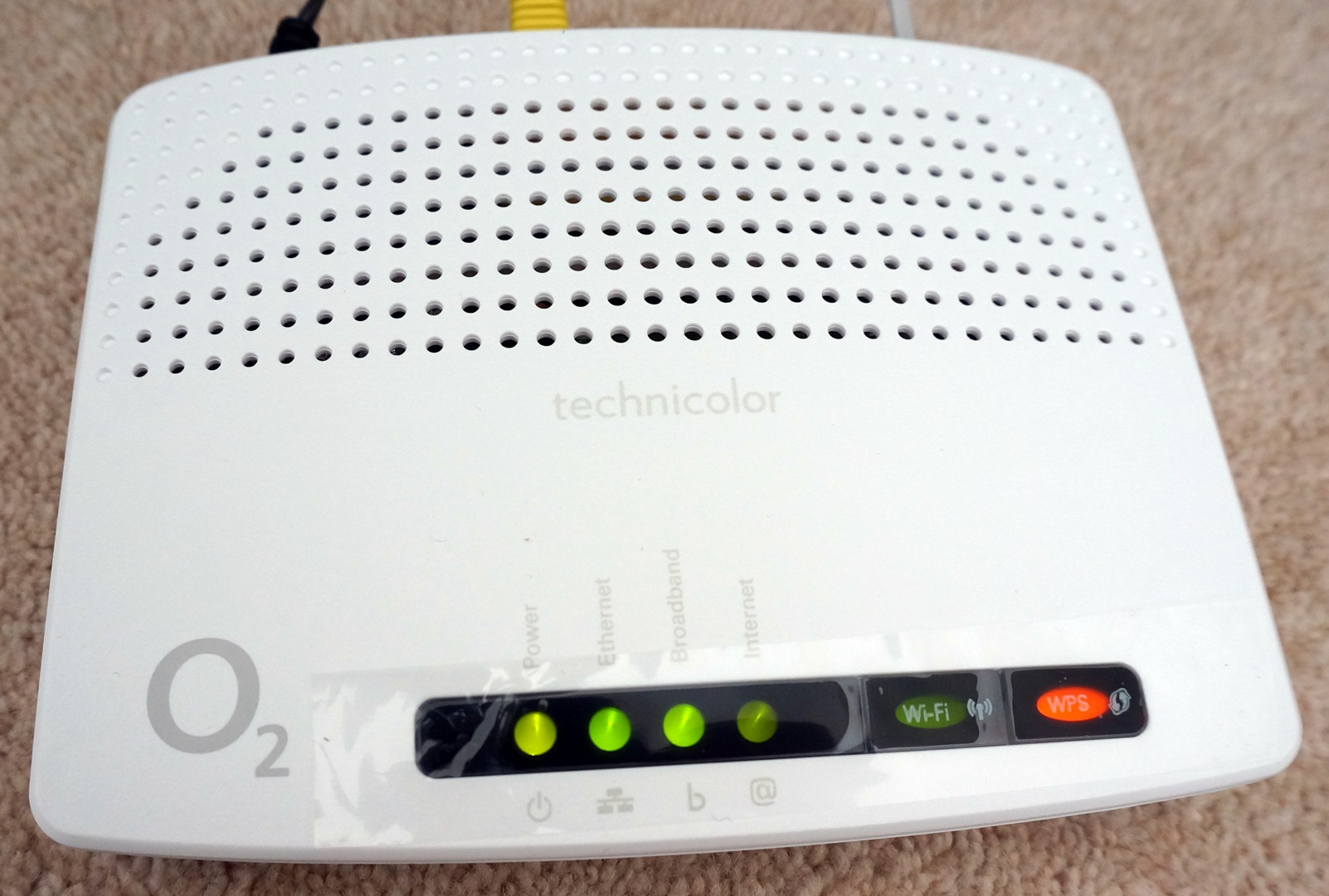
- Manufacturer: Thomson SA
- Type: Wireless base station
- Connectivity: Ethernet; WLAN; O2 Wireless Box: Wi-Fi (802.11b / 802.11g); O2 Wireless Box II: Wi-Fi (802.11b / 802.11g); O2 Wireless Box III: Wi-Fi (802.11b / 802.11g / 802.11n); O2 Wireless Box IV: Wi-Fi (802.11b / 802.11g / 802.11n); O2 Wireless Box V: Wi-Fi (802.11b / 802.11g / 802.11n)

The O2 Wireless Box is a wireless residential gateway router distributed by O2. The latest version is based on the 802.11n standard and also supports 802.11g and 802.11b devices. The device connects to the Internet using either an ADSL2+ or ADSL connection.

== Features ==
The O2 Wireless Box is a wireless residential gateway router. It supports wireless internet access through 802.11n, 802.11g and 802.11b.

== Comparison ==
The original O2 Wireless Box (available to new O2 customers from 2006, now discontinued) was a rebadged Thomson SpeedTouch 780WL.

The http interface on the O2 Wireless Box IV

The O2 Wireless Box II (available to new O2 customers from 2008) is a rebadged Thomson SpeedTouch TG585v7, and supports Interface type 802.11b/g. It supports 13 channels (Europe Region). It supports WEP and WPA-PSK encryption. Unlike the original Thomson TG585v7, it does not allow changing the ADSL username and password, so it cannot be used to connect to any other service provider.

The O2 Wireless Box IV (available to new "O2 Premium" customers during 2010) is a rebadged Thomson SpeedTouch TG587nv2, which has additional support for 802.11n, dual antennas, and also has two USB ports for connection to an external USB hard disk for sharing of files direct to the wifi or Ethernet network, or printer sharing.

The O2 Wireless Box V (the new "standard" router) is a rebadged Thomson SpeedTouch TG582n. It has 802.11n support, internal antenna, and one USB port.

Version	Manufacturer Model Number	Image	Modem	Connectivity
O2 Wireless Box	Thomson; SpeedTouch; 780WL		ADSL, ADSL2+	4 Fast Ethernet; Wi-Fi (802.11b / 802.11g)
O2 Wireless Box II	Thomson; SpeedTouch; TG585v7		ADSL, ADSL2+	4 Fast Ethernet; Wi-Fi (802.11b / 802.11g)
O2 Wireless Box III	Thomson; TG585n		ADSL, ADSL2+	4 Fast Ethernet; Wi-Fi (802.11b / 802.11g / 802.11n)
O2 Wireless Box IV	Thomson; TG587nV2		ADSL, ADSL2+	4 Fast Ethernet; Wi-Fi (802.11b / 802.11g / 802.11n); 2 USB
O2 Wireless Box V	TG582n		ADSL, ADSL2+,	4 Fast Ethernet; Wi-Fi (802.11b / 802.11g / 802.11n); 1 USB
