= VivaConnect =

Indian mobile media company

- Type: Privately Held Company
- Founded: 2001
- Founder: Vikram Raichura
- Headquarters: Mumbai, India
- Products: LiveTalk, adtalk, ivote, more, helo marketing cloud etc.
- Services: Mobile Based Solutions
- Number of employees: 200 (2017)

VivaConnect is an Indian mobile media company which provides voice and missed call services. It's among the largest mobile marketing companies in India. It holds a pool of 2000 PRIs handling a daily traffic of over 50 million voice calls.

== History ==
VivaConnect previously known as Viva Infomedia, started in 2001 when its managing director, Santosh Pandit, started selling Business Directories to SMEs. In 2008, when mobile penetration increased in India, the company's focus shifted to SMS based marketing solutions. After getting good results in SMS Marketing Solutions, Ponnamma understood the potential of Mobile based marketing solutions and entered into Voice Call domain as well.

== Products ==
=== LiveTalk ===
LiveTalk is used for Live audio streaming of events over a phone call. A user calls on a published phone number and then experiences Live audio streaming of the event without any internet, smartphone, or subscription to special or premium add-on services. The caller can avail this facility at the rate of a regular phone call without any extra charges. LiveTalk was used extensively by Bharatiya Janata Party in its 2014 Lok Sabha campaign to reach Media Dark Regions in India. It broadcast Narendra Modi's speeches directly via phone call.

After BJP won the 2014 Lok Sabha Elections, LiveTalk was also used to broadcast India's Prime Minister Narendra Modi's oath taking ceremony Live on Mobile Phones and later on India's Independence Day, 15 August.

LiveTalk also won three Gold awards at Mobile Marketing Association's Smarties India 2014.

=== AdTalk ===
In 2014, Facebook launched a Missed Call Ad Unit business specifically for the feature phone heavy Indian market. To scale-up its reach across mobile devices, Facebook partnered with VivaConnect for its missed call platform.

When a person sees an ad on Facebook, they can place a ‘Missed Call’ by clicking the ad from their mobile device. In the return call, the person receives valuable content, such as music, cricket scores or celebrity messages, alongside a brand message from the advertiser, without using airtime or data.

=== MoRe ===
MoRe is a gratification service that enables a customer to avail mobile recharge by giving a missed call. The service is designed for brands to offer gratification marketing schemes, by delivering mobile talk-time refill to its customers in return of a product purchase or on engagement with brands marketing activity.

=== iVote ===
iVote is a Missed Call-based product that enables people to cast their votes without incurring any charges. It is mainly used by Television reality shows, marketing/branding campaigns that operate on voting mechanism.

== Services ==
=== Email and SMS ===
In 2007, VivaConnect started delivering marketing/transactional information to the targeted audience of its clients, over e-mail and SMS.

=== Missed Call ===
A user gives a Missed Call to a specified phone number and then further engagement can be built on it.

=== Voice ===
VivaConnect's Voice Call Services primarily provides two services:

- Promotional : Used by brands or companies to send promotional voice calls to the target audience
- Transactional : Used to deliver transactional information like account details, one-time passwords, ticket booking status to customers in real-time.

In 2015, VivaConnect won two awards at ACEF (Asian Customer Engagement Forum) for its Voice Call based game, designed to promote the car Bolt from Tata Motors.

== Social Campaigns ==
In 2014, VivaConnect took an initiative, iChooseMyIndia, which allowed people to register their opinion by giving a missed call in favour of the political party they thought could bring a difference. The website, ichoosemyindia.com, was used to flash Live results of the poll.

== Offices ==
VivaConnect's Head Office is based in Mumbai. It also has a branch in Noida.
