= Creative Commons NonCommercial license =

Licenses allowing free noncommercial use

"Creative Commons Attribution-NonCommercial", also called "CC BY-NC", is the basic noncommercial license from Creative Commons.

A Creative Commons NonCommercial license (CC NC, CC BY-NC or NC license) is a Creative Commons license which a copyright holder can apply to their media to give public permission for anyone to reuse that media only for noncommercial activities. Creative Commons is an organization which develops a variety of public copyright licenses, and the "noncommercial" licenses are a subset of these. Unlike the CC0, CC BY, and CC BY-SA licenses, the CC BY-NC license is considered non-free, as it restricts the usage of the work to strictly noncommercial activities, violating free content's requirement for unrestricted reuse and redistribution.

A challenge with using these licenses is determining what noncommercial use is.

== Defining "Noncommercial" ==
"Defining 'Noncommercial'", a 2009 report from Creative Commons on the concept of noncommercial media

In September 2009 Creative Commons published a report titled, "Defining 'Noncommercial'". The report featured survey data, analysis, and expert opinions on what "noncommercial" means, how it applied to contemporary media, and how people who share media interpret the term. The report found that in some aspects there was public agreement on the meaning of "noncommercial", but for other aspects, there is wide variation in expectation of what the term means.

The Conference on College Composition and Communication commented that creators and re-users have their own biases and tend to interpret "noncommercial" in a way that favors their own use.

Online magazine repeated the report's claim that two-thirds of Creative Commons usage was with noncommercial licenses and that there was public confusion about how people should reuse such content.

Various bloggers commented that the ambiguity which the report exposed provided supporting evidence of the need to establish clarification and certainty into what it means to apply the license and reuse media under the license.

== Commentary ==
An examination of media use in biodiversity research publications reported that people both offering and reusing biodiversity media with the noncommercial license have a variety of conflicting understandings about what this should mean.

Erik Möller raised concerns about the use of Creative Commons' non-commercial license. Works distributed under the Creative Commons Non-Commercial license are not compatible with many open-content sites, including Wikipedia, which explicitly allow and encourage some commercial uses. Möller explained that "the people who are likely to be hurt by an -NC license are not large corporations, but small publications like weblogs, advertising-funded radio stations, or local newspapers."

Lessig responded that the current copyright regime also harms compatibility and that authors can lessen this incompatibility by choosing the least restrictive license. Additionally, the non-commercial license is useful for preventing someone else from capitalizing on an author's work when the author still plans to do so in the future. The non-commercial licenses have also been criticized for being too vague about which uses count as "commercial" and "non-commercial".

Great Minds, a non-profit educational publisher that released works under an -NC license, sued FedEx for violating the license because a school had used its services to mass-produce photocopies of the work, thus commercially exploiting the works. A U.S. judge dismissed the case in February 2017, ruling that FedEx was an intermediary, and that the provision of the license "does not limit a licensee's ability to use third parties in exercising the rights granted [by the licensor]." Great Minds appealed the decision to the United States Court of Appeals for the Second Circuit later that year. The 2nd Circuit upheld the lower court's decision in March 2018, concluding that FedEx neither infringed copyrights nor violated the license. Circuit judge Susan L. Carney argued in the court statement:

We hold that, in view of the absence of any clear license language to the contrary, licensees may use third‐party agents such as commercial reproduction services in furtherance of their own permitted noncommercial uses. Because FedEx acted as the mere agent of licensee school districts when it reproduced Great Minds' materials, and because there is no dispute that the school districts themselves sought to use Great Minds' materials for permissible purposes, we conclude that FedEx's activities did not breach the license or violate Great Minds' copyright.
