= Speech interface guideline =

Guideline for designing interfaces operated by human voice

Speech interface guideline is a guideline with the aim for guiding decisions and criteria regarding designing interfaces operated by human voice. Speech interface systems have many advantages such as consistent service and saving cost. However, for users, listening is a difficult task. It can become impossible when too many options are provided at once. This may mean that a user cannot intuitively reach a decision. To avoid this problem, limit options and a few clear choices the developer should consider such difficulties are usually provided. The guideline suggests the solution which is able to satisfy the users (customers). The goal of the guideline is to make an automated transaction at least as attractive and efficient as interacting with an attendant.

== Examples of common design guideline ==
The following guideline is given by the Lucent Technologies (now Alcatel-Lucent USA) CONVERSANT System Version 6.0 Application Design Guidelines

- Know Your Callers
- Use Simple and Natural Dialogue
- Minimize Demands on the Caller’s Memory
- Be Consistent
- Provide Feedback
- Provide Easy Exits
- Offer Shortcuts
- Allow Time for Caller Responses
- When Caller Errors Occur

== See also ==
- Human-computer interaction
- Human interface guidelines
- Speech processing
- Speech recognition
- Speech technology
