= Lunga, Florești =

Lunga
- Village
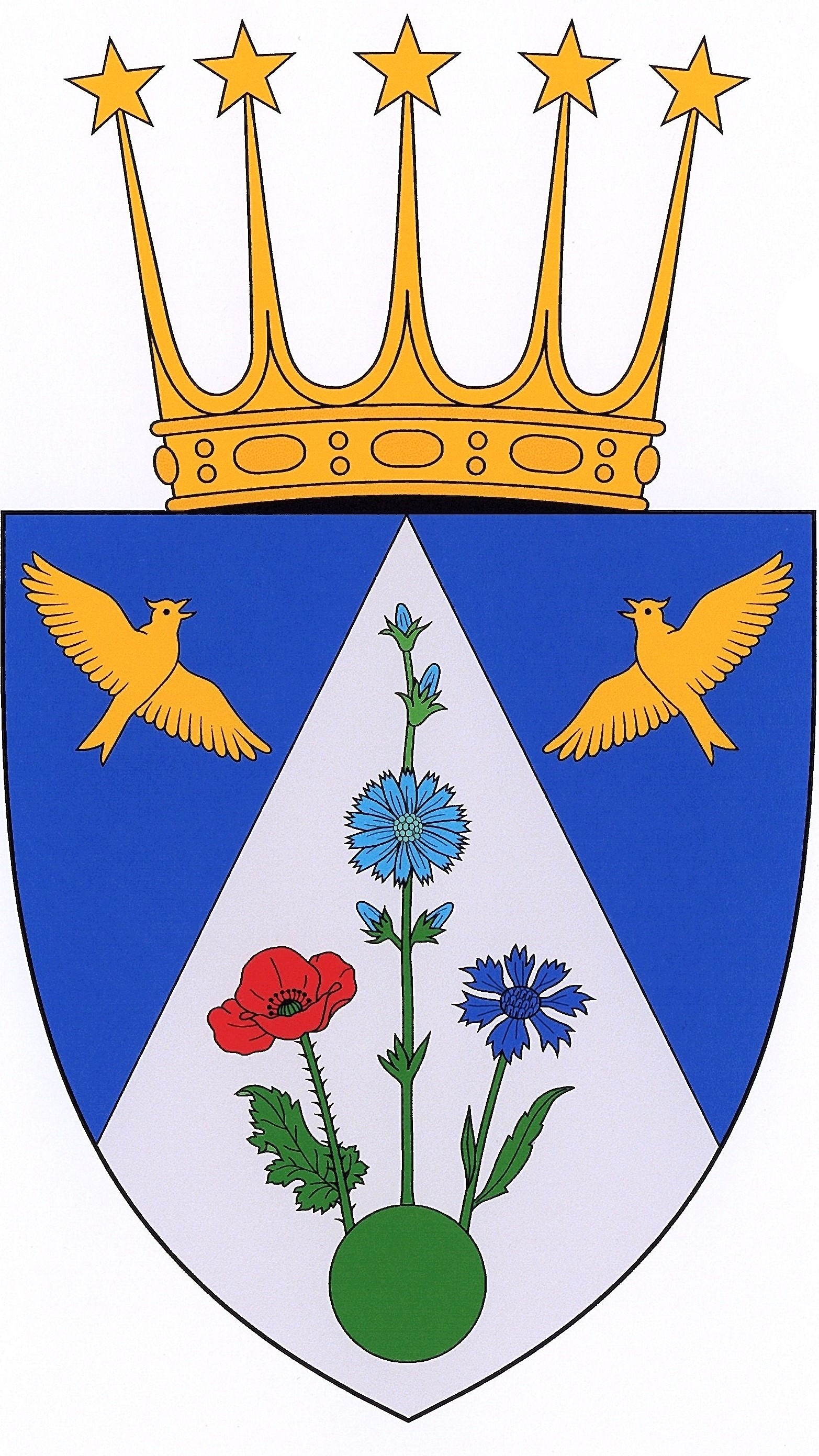
- Coat of arms

- Location within Moldova
- Coordinates: 47.9113888889°N 28.0486111111°E
- Country: Moldova
- District: Florești District

Government
  - Mayor: Galina Burduja (PDM)

Population (2014 census)
  - Total: 1,547
- Time zone: UTC+2 (EET)
  - Summer (DST): UTC+3 (EEST)

Lunga is a commune in Florești District, Moldova, just south of the R13 and north of the Raut river.
