= The Gift of Gab (short story) =

- Short story by Jack Vance
- Country: United States
- Language: English
- Genre(s): Science fiction

Publication
- Publisher: Astounding
- Publication date: September 1955

"The Gift of Gab" is an early science fiction short story by American author Jack Vance, first published in 1955. It is a mystery story, and the main theme is the nature of intelligence.

== Plot summary ==
Mineral prospectors on another planet examine their environment more closely when crew members start to disappear. There seems to be no intelligent life on the planet, which is predominantly covered by shallow seas, teeming with marine life; but one of the scientists who is studying the marine species in aquariums begins to suspect that the decapods, a creature similar to a squid or nautilus with ten tentacles and eyes, may be smarter than an ordinary mollusc. He attempts to teach a semaphore-like code, using the decapods's tentacles like hands of a clock to represent letters that can spell out English.

Meanwhile, the prospectors discover rich mineral deposits on the floor of the sea that can be easily mined, but at the cost of destroying the species. The biologist argues that intelligent life cannot be lightly wiped out, while the prospectors argue there is no intelligence and plot to kill the nautilus. At the climax, a prospector secretly poisons the decapod with acid, but the biologist rescues it just in time as the decapod signals "H-O-T-W-A-T-E-R" and then names the prospector.
