= Information Today =

American publishing company

- Founded: June 1, 1985
- Country of origin: United States
- Headquarters location: Medford, New Jersey, United States
- Publication types: Magazines, newsletters, books
- Nonfiction topics: Internet, knowledge management, library science
- Imprints: Plexus, CyberAge Books
- No. of employees: 150
- Official website: infotoday.com

Information Today, Inc., is an American publishing company. It publishes Internet and technology magazines, newsletters, books, directories and online products.

Information Today was previously known as Learned Information, Inc. Learned Information incorporated on June 1, 1980; the name change was effective June 1, 1995. Learned Information Ltd, an affiliate based in Oxford, England, remained Information Today's European distributor after the name change. Likewise, Information Today remained Learned Information Ltd's distributor.

As of January 2000, Information Today published Information Today, a newsletter (published at least since 1987), and other products geared toward "information users and professionals". That year, it bought Knowledge Asset Media, a company with a similar focus on knowledge management. As of 2012, Information Today ran a conference called Internet Librarian.

Information Today was founded by Thomas Hogan and Roger Bilboul. Its headquarters are in Medford, New Jersey.

== Publications ==
=== Magazines ===
- Big Data Quarterly
- Computers in Libraries
- CRM Magazine
- Database Trends and Applications
- EventDV (formerly EMedia)
- Information Today (ISSN 8755-6286)
- KMWorld
- Link-Up/Link-Up Digital
- Internet@Schools
- Online Searcher – a 2013 merger of Online and Searcher
- Speech Technology
- Streaming Media
- Streaming Media Europe
- Streaming Media Producer

=== Newsletters ===
- CyberSkeptic's Guide to Internet Research
- The Information Advisor’s Guide to Internet Research
- MLS – Marketing Library Services

== Books ==
- Information Today Books
  - CyberAge Books
- Plexus Publishing
  - Medford Books
