= SpeedTouch =

Brand name of a line of networking equipment

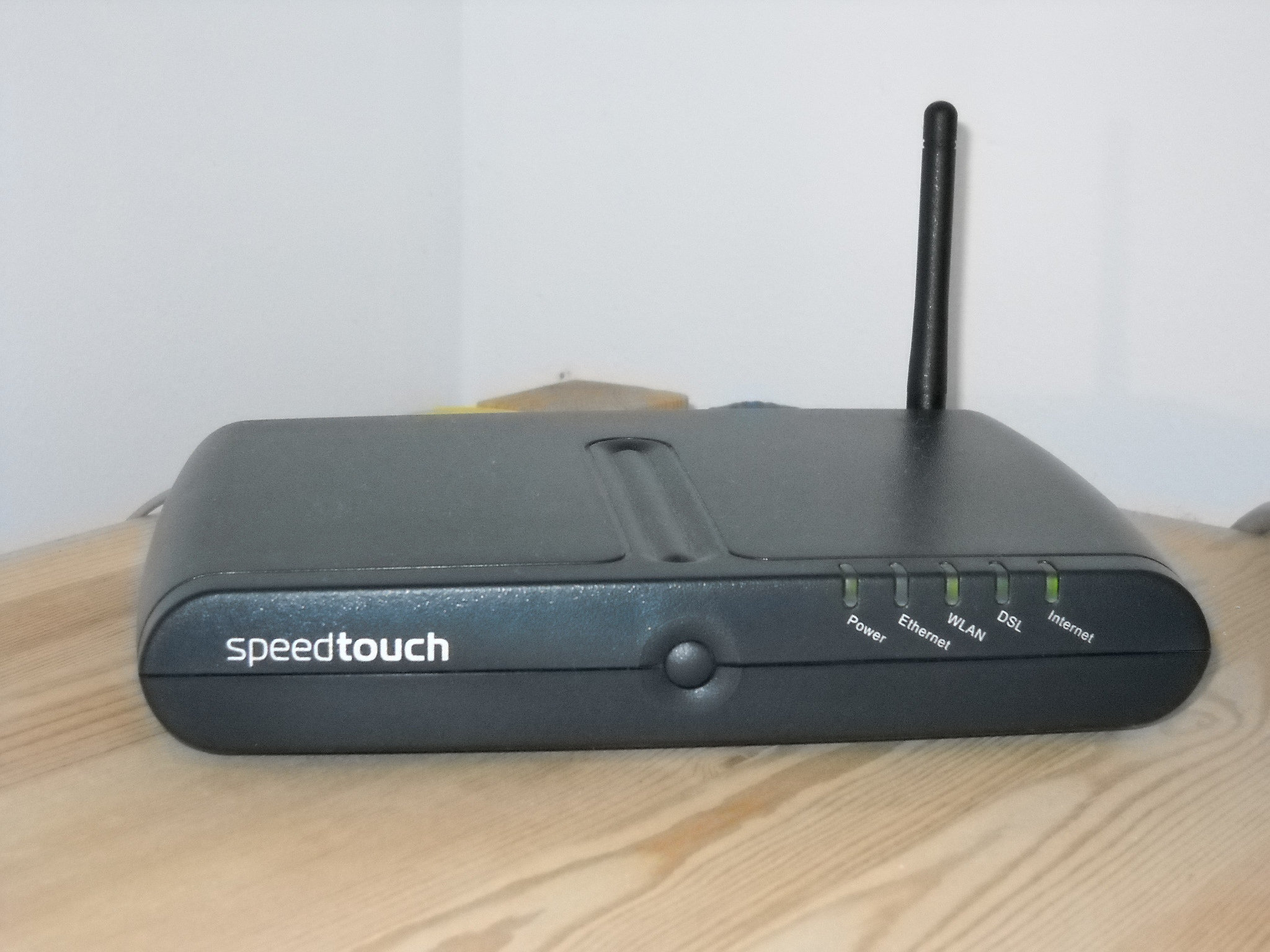
- SpeedTouch 585v6 with wireless antenna
- Manufacturer: Alcatel (1999-2001); Thomson Multimedia (2001-2009)
- Type: Customer-premises equipment
- Website: speedtouch.com at the Wayback Machine (archived 2006-08-27)

SpeedTouch (originally Speed Touch) is a discontinued product line of customer-premises equipment that was initially produced by Alcatel and later by Thomson Multimedia. It includes ADSL and ADSL2+ modems, residential gateways, Wireless access equipment, VoIP handsets and SHDSL equipment for interconnections.

== History ==
In June 2001, a memorandum of understanding was signed between Alcatel and Thomson Multimedia to sell the DSL business for 456 million euros paid in new shares to Thomson. The SpeedTouch brand was discontinued by in 2009 when the devices were rebranded as "Thomson Gateway".

== Models ==
List of SpeedTouch models (non-exhaustive)
Picture	Model	Description
	SpeedTouch Home	A modem which provides bridged and PPTP connections for Internet connectivity. The modem uses an Ethernet cable to connect to a PC, or may be connected to a router that supports PPPoE.
	Speedtouch Pro	Same as the SpeedTouch Home, but with added Point-to-Point Protocol and basic NAT (Network Address Translation) functionality.
	SpeedTouch USB and SpeedTouch 330	A basic ADSL USB modem, without router features and capable of speeds up to 1 Mbit up and 8 Mbit down. Due to its USB connection it requires drivers to work and is currently not supported well on Linux and not at all on intel-powered Macs or on Windows 95 and earlier. Digital Spy noted issues with the high amount of current drawn on certain VIA motherboards. It was nicknamed 'stingray' due to its shape.
	SpeedTouch PC	A PCI extension card ADSL modem. This modem is more or less obsolete and has never been distributed in large numbers.
	ST510 1/4 ports /ST530(+USB)	Widely distributed ADSL modems with built in NAT router, firewall and UPnP. The ST510 is available with either 1 or 4 Ethernet ports. The ST530 only provides 1 Ethernet socket, but can also be connected through USB.
	ST516	The first ADSL2+ modem in the SpeedTouch line-up. As with the ST510, this modem has a built in NAT router, firewall and UPnP. Firmware versions R5.3 and up also provide functionalities such as ALG (Application Layer Gateway) for VPN connections, remote management of the webinterface and Dynamic DNS. The middle number in the model number "5x6" indicates the number of Ethernet ports available on the modem. Firmware version 6.2.29.2 does not support PPTP (or GRE forwarding) when the ST516 is used in router mode.
	ST536	A single Ethernet and single USB port gateway with built in firewall.
	ST546	A four Ethernet port gateway with built in firewall.
	ST610 / ST610i / ST610s / ST610v	A line of business DSL routers launched in 2003, with optional IPSec and SIP support activated by software keys. Fixed WAN options are ADSL over POTS (ST610), ADSL over ISDN (ST610i), SHDSL (ST610s) and VDSL (ST610v). They are available either with a 4-port 10/100 LAN switch, or with an ATMF-25 LAN or WAN interface (except the 610v)
	ST570	The first wireless modem in the SpeedTouch line. The ST570 features 802.11b wireless networking (11 Mbit/s) and can be secured using WEP and MAC filtering. The ST570 has 1 Ethernet port.
	ST580	A more advanced wireless modem. The ST580 has 802.11g wireless networking and can be secured with WPA encryption.
	ST585	Similar to the 580, but with added ADSL2+ support and better WPA encryption. Four Ethernet ports and wireless antennae. Widely distributed by Tiscali, O2, AOL and PlusNet in the UK. O2 rebrands this as "O2 Wireless Box II", and O2's BeThere subsidiary calls it the "BeBox".
	ST587	
	ST620	A four Ethernet port gateway with wireless antennae and a built in firewall designed for business use.
	ST780	ADSL2+ high-speed Internet access and video service together with telephony, wireless with WEP2, 4 Ethernet ports, 2 analog phone ports for internal sip client, 1 pstn connector.

== Security ==
SpeedTouch gateways have been criticized because the algorithm used by the manufacturer to set both the default SSID and the corresponding WEP/WPA-PSK/WPA2-PSK passwords was very easily compromised, meaning that wireless access to SpeedTouch models that still use the default password is easily possible.

In 2002 San Diego Supercomputer Center of the University of California reported their testing of Alcatel SpeedTouch devices that identified multiple security issues. They said:

Researchers associated with the San Diego Supercomputer Center at the University of California, San Diego have identified multiple implementation flaws in the Alcatel Speed Touch ADSL "modem" (actually an ADSL-Ethernet router/bridge). These flaws can allow an intruder to take complete control of the device, including changing its configuration, uploading new firmware, and disrupting the communications between the telephone central office providing ADSL service and the device.

These flaws allow the following malicious actions:

- changing the device's configuration such that the device can no longer be accessed;
- disabling the device, either temporarily or permanently (requiring return of the device to the manufacturer); and
- installation of malicious code, such as a network sniffer to gather local LAN traffic (that is not being bridged) and making the box more easily/covertly remotely accessible.

One of the more interesting discoveries was a cryptographic challenge-response back door that completely bypasses any password that a user may have set on the device.
