= Gift (surname) =

Gift is a surname. It may be an English surname attested by 1490 the latest, possibly from the given name "Gift". Notable people with the surname include:

- Elijah Gift (born 2006), Spanish football winger
- Jassie Gift (born 1975), South Indian singer and music composer
- Roland Gift (born 1961), British singer and actor
- Wayne Gift (1915–1998), American football player
