= Graduate Institute of Ferrous Technology =

South Korean research institute

Coordinates: 36.0110°N 129.3278°E

Graduate Institute of Ferrous Technology (GIFT)
- 철강대학원
- Motto: The World's Best in Ferrous Technology!
- Type: Private
- Established: 1993
- Dean: Nack Joon Kim (incumbent)
- Faculty: 36
- Postgraduates: 428
- Location: Pohang, North Gyeongsang, South Korea
- Campus: Urban
- Website: gift.postech.ac.kr

- Graduate Institute of Ferrous Technology
- Hangul: 철강대학원
- Hanja: 鐵鋼大學院
- RR: Cheolgang daehagwon
- MR: Ch'ŏlgang taehagwŏn

The Graduate Institute of Ferrous Technology (GIFT POSTECH) is an institute for graduate-level education and research in the field of iron and steel technology at Pohang University of Science and Technology, South Korea. It has nine specialized laboratories covering all sides of metallurgy. However, the Institute now has a reduced focus on steels, having introduced laboratories on battery electronics.

== History ==
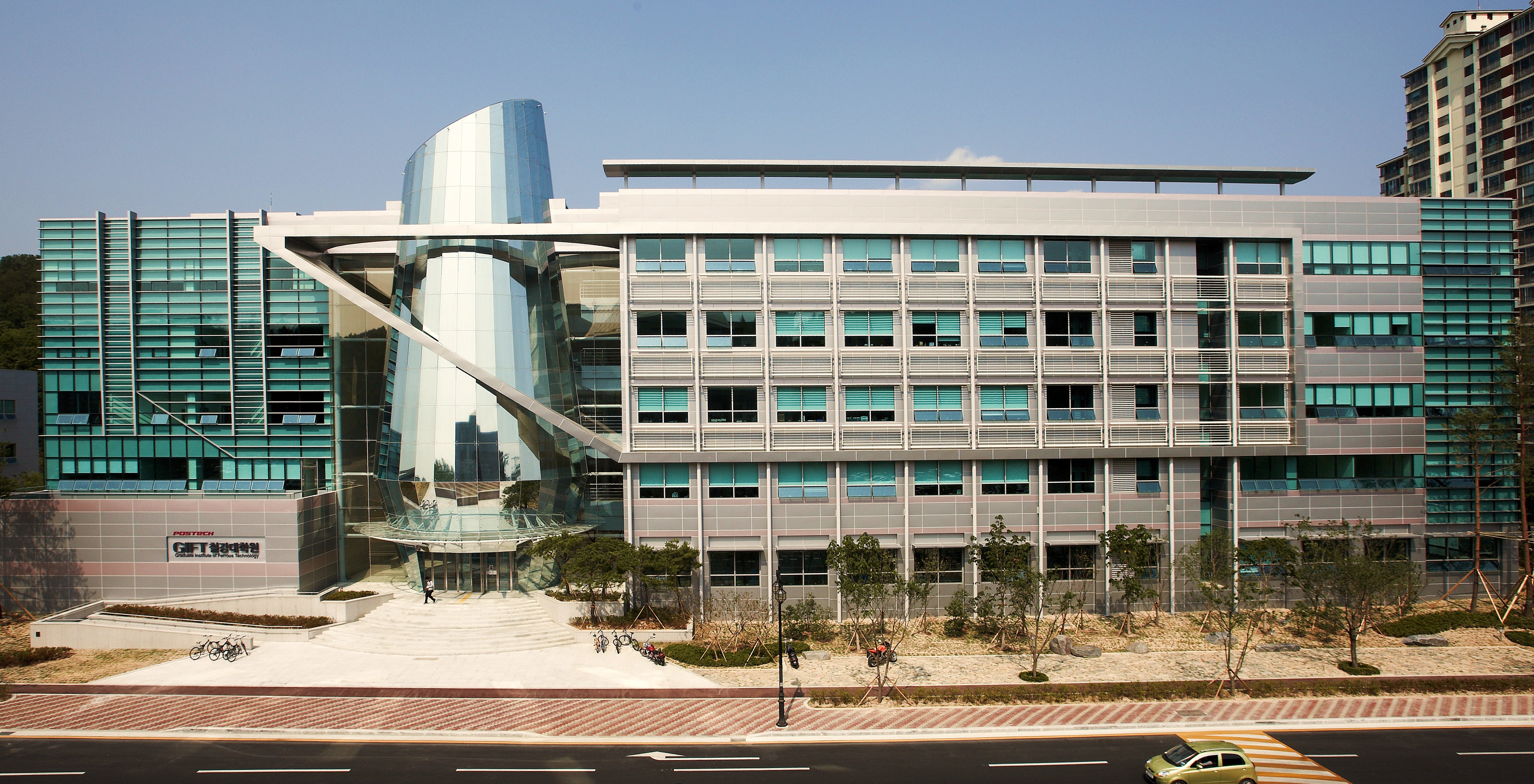
The new building of GIFT. June 2009

POSCO, one of the world's biggest steel production companies, in 1986, initiated a founding of a science and technology university in the city of Pohang, about 200 miles southeast of Seoul, the capital city of Korea. Pohang University of Science and Technology (POSTECH) has now become one of the top research universities in Asia. GIFT was founded to provide an academic environment for education and research on ferrous materials.

Month	Year	Fact
November	1993	The Graduate School of Iron & Steel Technology (GSIST) Foundation Committee was formed.
October 21	1994	The Ministry of Education approved the establishment of GSIST.
February	1995	Dr. Kyoo Young Kim was appointed as the first Dean of GSIST.
March	1995	GSIST opening; Admission of 54 students to the M.S. degree program.
February	1997	Commencement ceremony for the first 52 graduates was held.
June	1999	English was adopted as the official language of instruction by the Graduate School Committee.
December	1999	The Ministry of Commerce, Industry and Energy selected the Technology Innovation Center for Metals and Materials (TICM) at GSIST for local area technology innovation.
February	2000	Dr. Hae-Geon Lee was appointed as Dean of GSIST.
March	2000	The Technology Innovation Center for Metals and Materials (TICM) was created.
April	2001	GSIST long-term development program was established for globalization in education and research.
November	2004	POSTECH and POSCO approved the New Ferrous Technology Innovation Program.
February	2005	GSIST celebrated its 10th anniversary. Since 1997, GSIST had produced 336 graduates including 43 foreign students.
July	2005	The Ministry of Education and Human Resources Development approved the foundation of the Graduate Institute of Ferrous Technology (GIFT).
September 9	2005	Graduate Institute of Ferrous Technology (GIFT) opening; Admission of 9 students (Master's: 7, Doctoral: 2).
March	2006	Admission of 11 students (Master's: 10, Doctoral: 1).
September	2006	Admission of 11 students (Master's: 10, Doctoral: 1), Appointment of 3 Research Faculty.
December	2006	The proposal on the construction of a new GIFT building was approved.
March	2007	Admission of 16 students (Master's: 11, Doctoral: 5)
September	2007	Admission of 9 students (Master's: 5, Doctoral: 4)
September	2007	The new GIFT Building Ground-breaking Ceremony was held.
June	2009	The new GIFT Building completed. Opening ceremony held.

== Structure ==
The Graduate Institute of Ferrous Technology has nine laboratories with key areas of expertise:

- Alternative Technology Lab:
  - Continuous casting-related innovation
  - Texture control
  - Alternative alloying and processing
- Control and Automation Lab:
  - Computer control system
  - Process automation
  - Control theory & Applications
  - Measurement
- Clean Steel Lab:
  - Thermochemistry
  - Physico-chemical properties
  - Fluid dynamics
  - Solidification and casting
- Environmental Metallurgy Lab:
  - Reduction of CO_{2} emission
  - Improvement of energy efficiency
  - Gas alloying technology
- Computational Metallurgy Lab:
  - Classical modeling and experiments
  - Phase field modeling and experiments
  - First principle calculation, quantum mechanical modeling
- Microstructure Control Lab:
  - Phase transformation / electron microscopy
  - Microscopic deformation behavior
  - Toughness enhancement via microstructure control
  - Innovative processing (e.g., twin-roll casting)
- Materials Design Lab:
  - Automotive Steels, Galvanized/Galvannealed Products
  - Electrical Steels
  - Stainless steels
  - Steel grades related to power generation
- Materials Mechanics Lab:
  - Net Shape Forming (sheet forming, other forming)
  - Performance in service (fracture, crashworthiness, fatigue)
- Surface Engineering Lab:
  - Composite coatings
  - Corrosion mechanism & lifetime prediction
  - Corrosion resistant alloy design
  - Metallic coatings

== People ==
Among the faculty members who have worked at the Graduate Institute of Ferrous Technology, several Professors are distinguished world-widely:

  - Sir Professor Harshad_Bhadeshia
  - Professor Frédéric Barlat
  - Professor Nack Joon KIM
  - Professor Bruno De Cooman
  - Prof. Yasushi Sasaki
  - Prof. Hae-Geon Lee
  - Prof. Chong Soo Lee
