= Gift Zulu =

Zambian footballer (born 1992)

Personal information
- Date of birth: 6 November 1992 (age 34)
- Place of birth: Chipata, Zambia
- Position: Defender

Team information
- Current team: Nkana F.C.
- Number: 27

Senior career*
Years	Team	Apps	(Gls)
2012–2013	Chadiza Health Rangers		
2014	Katele Rangers		
2015	Nampundwe FC		
2016–2018	Forest Rangers		
2018–	Nkana F.C.		

International career^{‡}
2019–2020	Zambia	4	(0)
- * Club domestic league appearances and goals ‡ National team caps and goals as of 21 July 2020

Gift Zulu (born 6 November 1992) is a Zambian footballer who plays as a defender for Nkana F.C. and the Zambia national football team.

== Career ==
=== International ===
In May 2018, Zulu was included in Zambia's squad for the 2019 COSAFA Cup. He would go on to make his senior international debut at that tournament, playing the entirety of a 4-2 penalty victory over Malawi.

== Career statistics ==
=== International ===
As of matches played 12 March 2020.

National team	Year	Apps	Goals
Zambia	2019	3	0
Zambia	2020	1	0
Total		4	0

== Honors ==
=== International ===
Zambia

- COSAFA Cup Champion: 2019
