= The Present (2014 film) =

- Directed by: Jacob Frey
- Written by: Markus Kranzler; Jacob Frey
- Based on: 'Perfeição' by Fabio Coala
- Produced by: Anna Matacz
- Starring: Samantha Brown; Quinn Nealy
- Music by: Tobias Buerger
- Production company: Filmakademie Baden-Wuerttemberg
- Release date: 2014
- Running time: 4 minutes
- Country: Germany
- Languages: German; English (dubbed)

The Present is a 2014 animated short film directed and co-written by Jacob Frey and co-written with Markus Kranzler. It is based on "Perfeição", a comic strip by Fabio Coala. The short film tells the story of a 12-year-old boy who gets a three-legged puppy from his mom, eventually warming up to him. The short explores the challenging topic of disability and living with an amputated leg.

The film has won 81 awards from several film festivals and has garnered acclaim from critics and audiences alike. Both Kranzler and Frey would go on to get hired at Pixar and Walt Disney Animation Studios respectively, particularly because of the attention The Present had received.

== Plot ==
Jake, a twelve-year-old boy, is playing a shooter video game in a darkened living room behind blinds when his mother arrives with a box which she says contains a present for him. After she goes upstairs to answer a phone call, Jake opens the box, discovering an energetic young puppy. Jake is initially delighted with the animal, but he soon turns to disgust when he sees that the puppy is missing most of his left front leg. He tosses the puppy away and continues playing his game. Unperturbed, the puppy finds a red rubber ball under a cabinet and walks up to the boy, carrying the rubber ball and inviting him to play. Jake kicks the ball away, but the puppy chases after it. The boy continues doing his best to ignore the puppy, but is soon won over by his determination and spirit, in spite of himself. Jake finally shuts off the video game and decides to go outside to play fetch with his new dog, where it is revealed that he walks with crutches, as his left leg has been amputated below the knee.

== Reception and legacy ==
The short film was screened at 293 different film festivals and has won 81 accolades from all film festivals and has received critical acclaim.

As a result of the film's success, both Frey and Kranzler moved to the United States and were hired at Walt Disney Animation Studios and Pixar, respectively. Frey has worked on Disney films such as Zootopia and Moana, while Kranzler has worked on Pixar films such as Finding Dory, Cars 3 and Coco.
