= Presence (amplification) =

Control that boosts the upper mid-range audion frequencies

In an amplifier, a presence control boosts the upper mid-range frequencies to make the sounds of voices and instruments with similar tonal ranges seem more "present".

On television production studio's sound desk, there can be several presence controls, for several different, switchable, frequencies. There is a limit to the flexibility of such controls, and they are sometimes insufficient. If the degree of mis-match between microphones is great, simply increasing presence is not enough, and instead a sound engineer will use a graphic equalizer, sometimes several, each connected to an individual sound channel.

Presence controls can also be found on electric guitar amplifiers. The first presence control on a Fender amplifier, for example, appeared in 1954 on the Twin. In 1955 it appeared on the 1/15 Pro-Amp, the 3/10 Bandmaster, the 2/10 Super, and the 4/10 Bassman. The original Fender presence control acted upon the amplifier's negative-feedback loop. As the level of "presence" was increased, so more and more of the higher frequencies in the negative-feedback loop were dumped to ground, leaving the low and mid-range frequencies. Increasing the presence resulted in there being less and less negative feedback on high frequencies. The effect varied according to amplitude.

Later Fender amplifiers used a different presence control. The presence control on the 1975 Fender Super Twin did not modify the negative feedback loop, but was an active equalization circuit, controlling the 3.9 kHz frequency range. It had the ability to both amplify (boost) and attenuate (cut), unlike the earlier presence control.

In a 3-way loudspeaker system, with tweeter, woofer, and mid-range speaker, a presence control is simply a volume control for the mid-range speaker.
