= Gift Tandare =

Zimbabwean politician

Gift Tandare (died 13 March 2007) was a member of the Zimbabwe political party Movement for Democratic Change. He was shot dead by police at a prayer meeting. The government of Zimbabwe denied the family permission to bury him at Granville cemetery in Harare, fearing reprisals from mourners. He was buried at his rural home.

Police attacked a wake held on the 18 March 2007.

On 28 March 2007 supporters held a rally in Harare.

== Reactions ==
The US Congress passed a bill condemning the Zimbabwe Government's actions.
