= Presentation (medical) =

Appearance of a patient

In medicine, a presentation is the appearance in a patient of illness or disease—or signs or symptoms thereof—before a medical professional. In practice, one usually speaks of a patient as presenting with this or that. Examples include:

- "...Many depressed patients present with medical rather than psychiatric complaints, and those who present with medical complaints are twice as likely to be misdiagnosed as those who present with psychiatric complaints."
- "...In contrast, poisonings from heavy metal can be subtle and present with a slowly progressive course."
- "...Some patients present with small unobstructed kidneys, when the diagnosis is easy to miss."
- "...A total of 7,870,266 patients presented to a public hospital ED from 1 July 2017 to 30 June 2018."

== See also ==
- Presentation (obstetrics)
