= Gift Lunga =

Zimbabwean footballer (born 1976)

Personal information
- Date of birth: 26 February 1976 (age 50)
- Height: 1.76 m (5 ft 9 in)
- Position: Midfielder

Senior career*
Years	Team	Apps	(Gls)
1995–2005	Highlanders F.C.		
2005–2007	CAPS United F.C.		
2008–2011	Highlanders F.C.		

International career
2004–2005	Zimbabwe	8	(0)
- * Club domestic league appearances and goals

Gift Lunga (born 26 February 1976) is a retired Zimbabwean football midfielder.
