= Phone tag =

Persistent voicemail over phonecalls

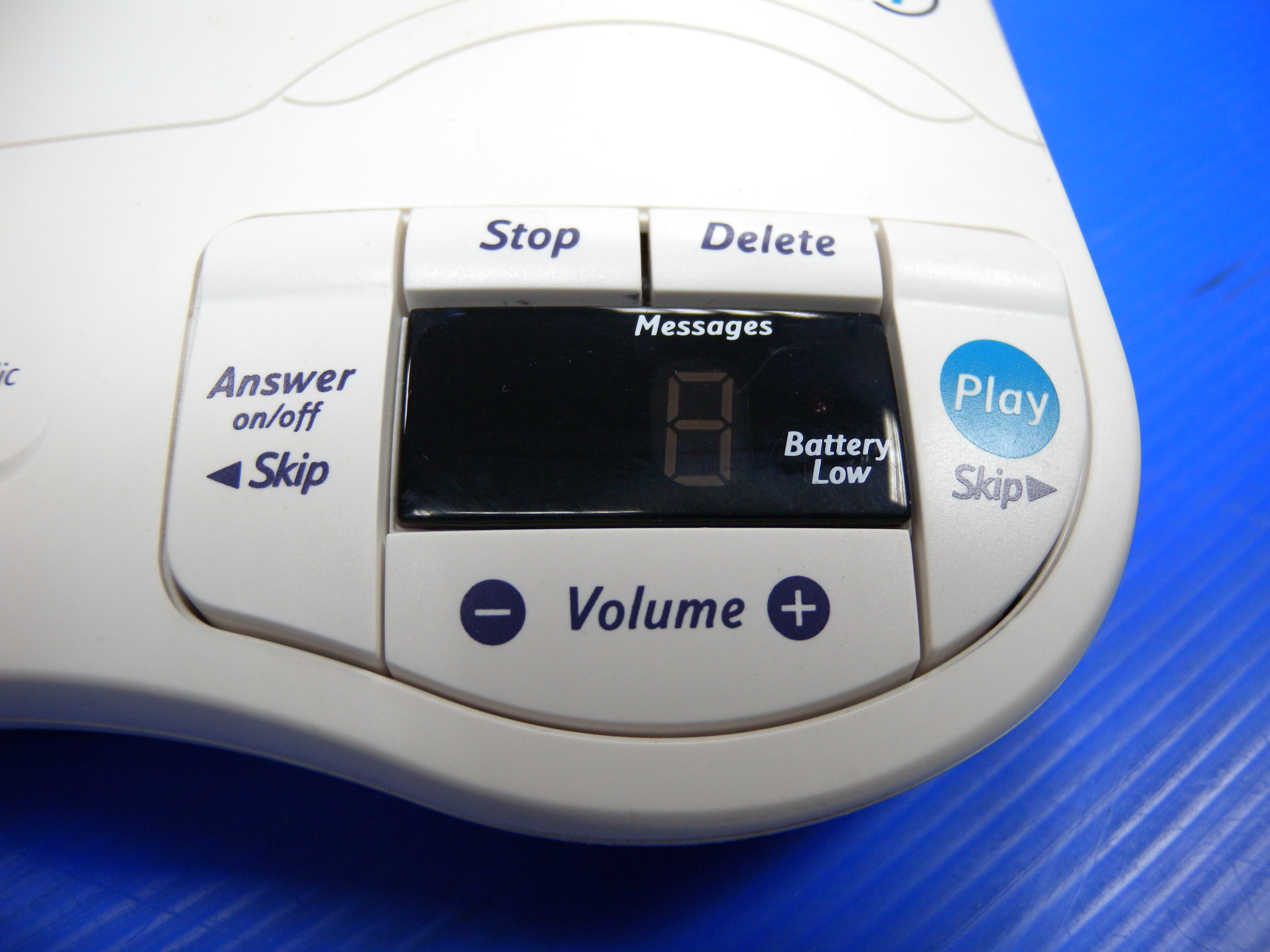
Phone tag can occur when people leave one another messages on answering machines

Phone tag is a phenomenon in which two parties attempt to contact each other by telephone, but neither is able to get a hold of the other for a conversation. Both parties may leave a message on the answering machine or voicemail of the other, and request a call back. This continues for a period of time, often with the two parties exchanging attempts to have a real-time conversation. The name derives from the playground game tag, where players chase one another in turn.

Phone tag became common in the 1980s with the advent of messaging technologies and caller ID. It was seen as having advantages in that people could leave and receive messages at their convenience rather than having to find a common time with the other party to have a conversation.

Phone tag, like later messaging inventions such as text messaging via SMS and WhatsApp, facilitates selectivity in communications.

Nowadays, emerging technologies can convert voice messages into text form, making it easier to check voicemail and get a message across.

== See also ==
- Prank call
- Robocall
- Telephone game
