= Online (magazine) =

Journal

- Publisher: Information Today, Inc.
- Founded: 1977
- Final issue: 2013
- Country: United States
- Based in: Indianapolis, Indiana
- Website: www.infotoday.com/online/
- ISSN: 0146-5422

Online was a magazine for information systems first published in 1977. The publisher Online, Inc. was founded the year before. The magazine was headquartered in Indianapolis, Indiana. In 2001, Information Today, Inc. acquired the assets of Online Inc. The first issue under Information Today, Inc. was published in January/February 2002. The magazine merged in 2013 with the magazine Searcher to form Online Searcher.

Marydee Ojala served as the editor of Online. The website contained selected full-text articles and news from each issue.

== See also ==
- Online magazine
