= Industrial espionage =

Theft of corporate information

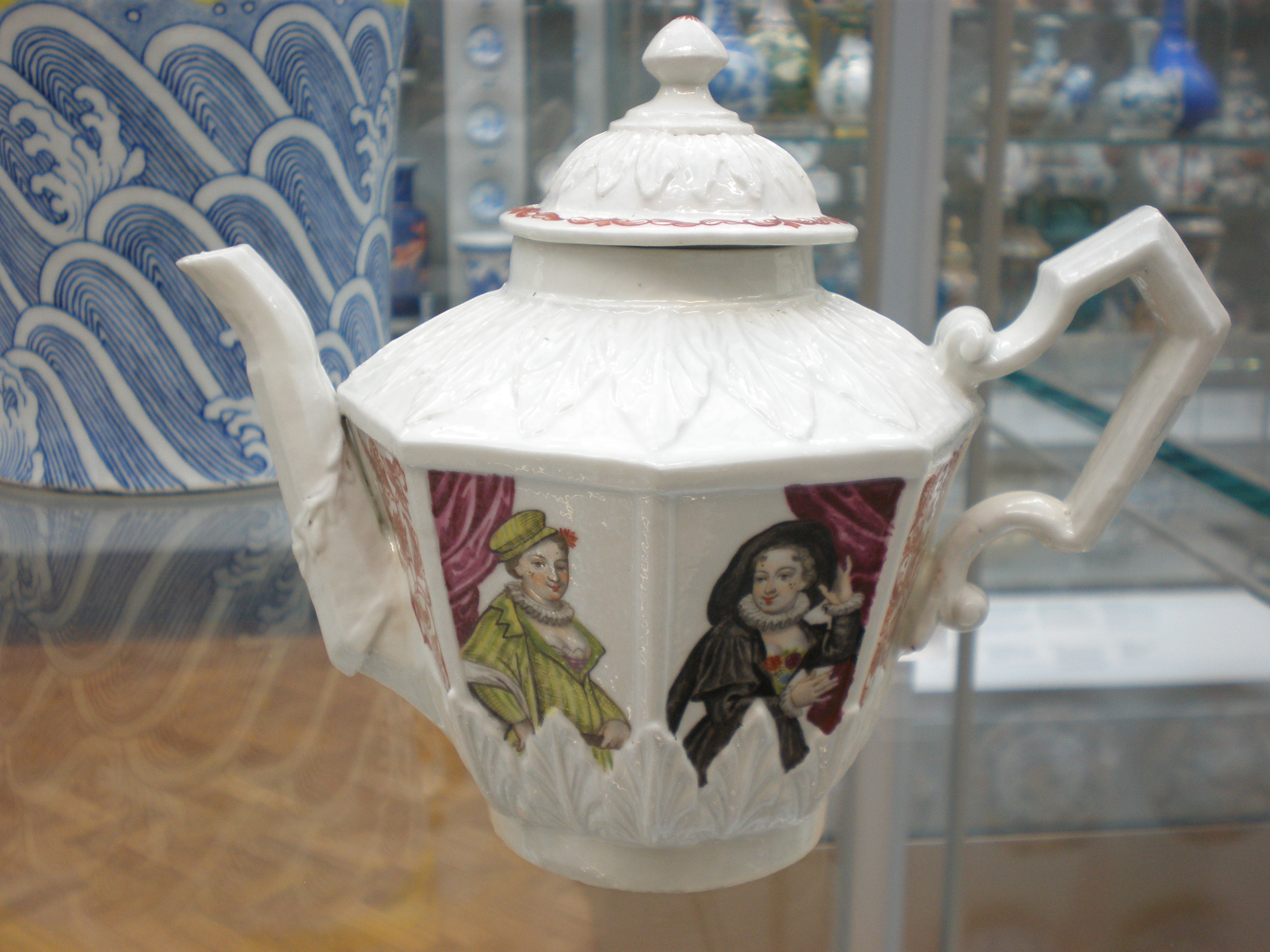
Teapot with Actresses, Vezzi porcelain factory, Venice, c. 1725. The Vezzi brothers were involved in a series of incidents of industrial espionage. It was these actions that led to the secret of manufacturing Meissen porcelain becoming widely known.

Industrial espionage, also known as economic espionage, corporate spying, or corporate espionage, refers to the systematic and unauthorized acquisition of sensitive business information. This practice typically targets trade secrets, proprietary operational data, and intellectual property belonging to competitors or other organizations. The information is gathered with the intent to gain a competitive advantage, facilitate business decision-making, or for commercial sale to interested parties. Industrial espionage is conducted by various actors, including current or former employees, contractors, corporate competitors, foreign governments, and criminal organizations, and is universally recognized as both illegal and unethical.

While political espionage is conducted or orchestrated by governments and is international in scope, industrial or corporate espionage is more often national and occurs between companies or corporations.

== Forms of economic and industrial espionage ==
In short, the purpose of espionage is to gather knowledge about one or more organizations. Economic or industrial espionage takes place in two main forms. It may include the acquisition of intellectual property, such as information on industrial manufacture, ideas, techniques and processes, recipes and formulas. Or it could include sequestration of proprietary or operational information, such as that on customer datasets, pricing, sales, marketing, research and development, policies, prospective bids, planning or marketing strategies or the changing compositions and locations of production. It may describe activities such as theft of trade secrets, bribery, blackmail and technological surveillance. As well as orchestrating espionage on commercial organizations, governments can also be targets – for example, to determine the terms of a tender for a government contract.

== Target industries ==
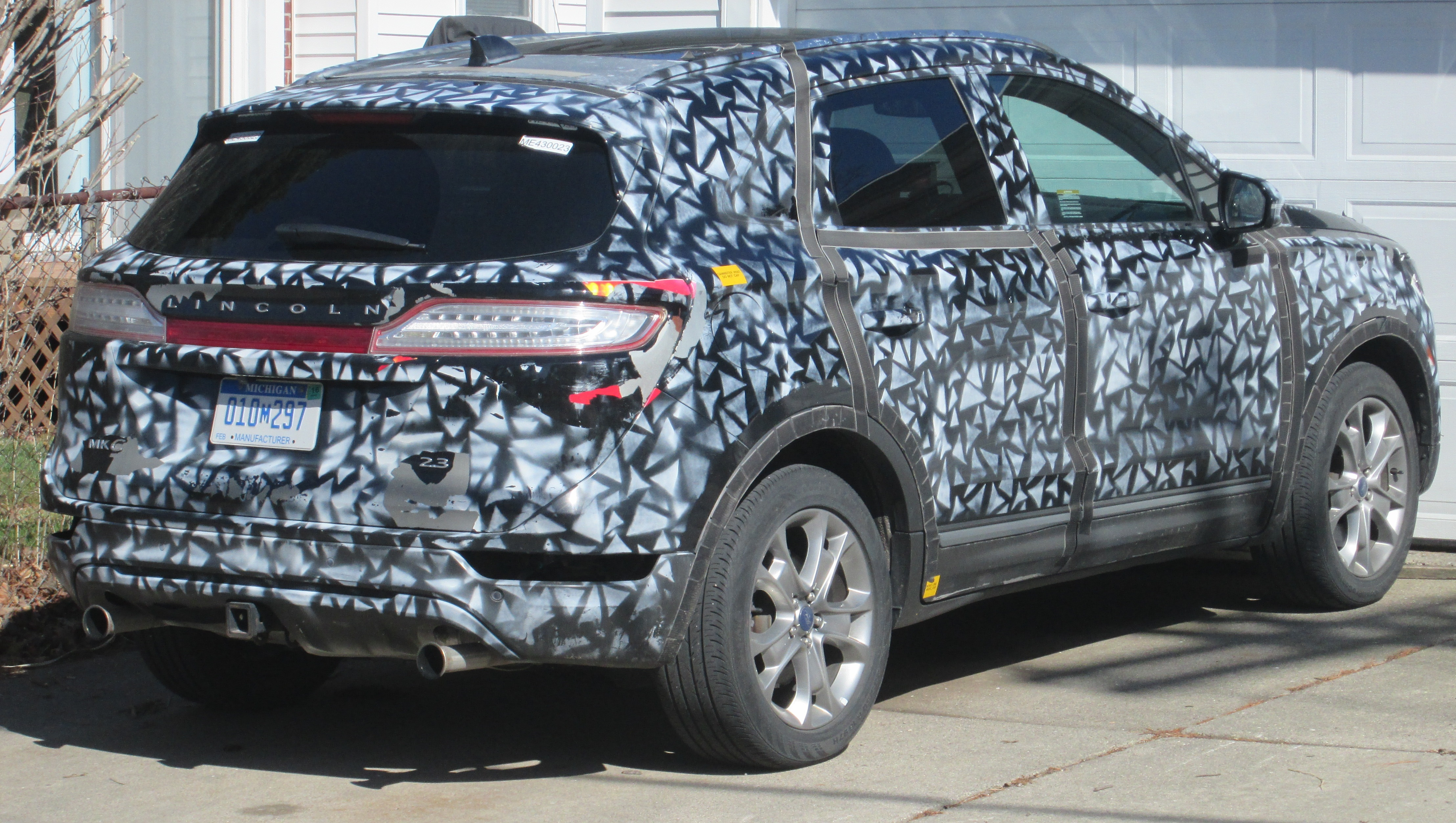
During testing, automakers commonly disguise upcoming car models with camouflage paint patterns designed to obfuscate the vehicle's lines. Padded covers or deceptive decals are also often used. This is also to prevent motoring media outlets from spoiling the model before its planned reveal.

Economic and industrial espionage is most commonly associated with technology-heavy industries, including computer software and hardware, biotechnology, aerospace, telecommunications, transportation and engine technology, automobiles, machine tools, energy, materials and coatings and so on. Silicon Valley is known to be one of the world's most targeted areas for espionage, though any industry with information of use to competitors may be a target.

== Information theft and sabotage ==
Information can make the difference between success and failure; if a trade secret is stolen, the competitive playing field is leveled or even tipped in favor of a competitor. Although a lot of information-gathering is accomplished legally through competitive intelligence, at times corporations feel the best way to get information is to take it. Economic or industrial espionage is a threat to any business whose livelihood depends on information.

In recent years, economic or industrial espionage has taken on an expanded definition. For instance, attempts to sabotage a corporation may be considered industrial espionage; in this sense, the term takes on the wider connotations of its parent word. That espionage and sabotage (corporate or otherwise) have become more clearly associated with each other is also demonstrated by a number of profiling studies, some government, some corporate. The United States government currently has a polygraph examination entitled the "Test of Espionage and Sabotage" (TES), contributing to the notion of the interrelationship between espionage and sabotage countermeasures. In practice, particularly by "trusted insiders", they are generally considered functionally identical for the purpose of informing countermeasures.

== Agents and the process of collection ==
Economic or industrial espionage commonly occurs in one of two ways. Firstly, a dissatisfied employee appropriates information to advance interests or to damage the company. Secondly, a competitor or foreign government seeks information to advance its own technological or financial interest. "Moles", or trusted insiders, are generally considered the best sources for economic or industrial espionage. Historically known as a "patsy", an insider can be induced, willingly or under duress, to provide information. A patsy may be initially asked to hand over inconsequential information and, once compromised by committing a crime, blackmailed into handing over more sensitive material. Individuals may leave one company to take up employment with another and take sensitive information with them. Such apparent behavior has been the focus of numerous industrial espionage cases that have resulted in legal battles. Some countries hire individuals to do spying rather than the use of their own intelligence agencies. Academics, business delegates, and students are often sought to be used by governments in gathering information. Some countries, such as Japan, have been reported to expect students to be debriefed on returning home. A spy may follow a guided tour of a factory and then get "lost". A spy could be an engineer, a maintenance man, a cleaner, an insurance salesman, or an inspector: anyone who has legitimate access to the premises.

A spy may break into the premises to steal data and may search through waste paper and refuse, known as "dumpster diving". Information may be compromised via unsolicited requests for information, marketing surveys, or use of technical support or research or software facilities. Outsourced industrial producers may ask for information outside the agreed-upon contract.

Computers have facilitated the process of collecting information because of the ease of access to large amounts of information through physical contact or the Internet.

== History ==
=== Origins ===
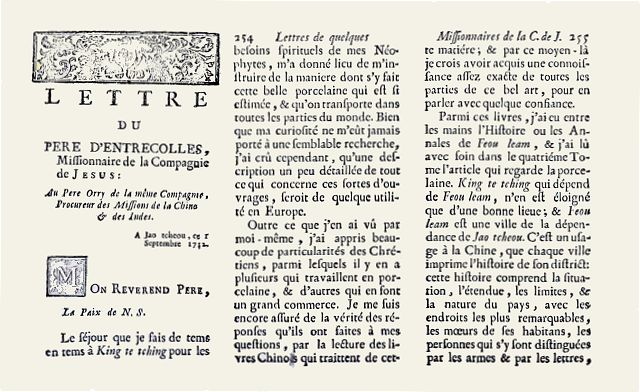
The work of a European priest, Father Francois Xavier d'Entrecolles to reveal to Europe the manufacturing methods of Chinese porcelain in 1712, is sometimes considered an early case of industrial espionage.

Economic and industrial espionage has a long history. Father Francois Xavier d'Entrecolles, who visited Jingdezhen, China in 1712 and later used this visit to reveal the manufacturing methods of Chinese porcelain to Europe, is sometimes considered to have conducted an early case of industrial espionage.

Historical accounts have been written of industrial espionage between Britain and France. Attributed to Britain's emergence as an "industrial creditor", the second decade of the 18th century saw the emergence of a large-scale state-sponsored effort to surreptitiously take British industrial technology to France. Witnesses confirmed both the inveigling of tradespersons abroad and the placing of apprentices in England. Protests by those such as ironworkers in Sheffield and steelworkers in Newcastle, about skilled industrial workers being enticed abroad, led to the first English legislation aimed at preventing this method of economic and industrial espionage. This did not prevent Samuel Slater from bringing British textile technology to the United States in 1789. To catch up with technological advances of European powers, the US government in the eighteenth and nineteenth centuries actively encouraged intellectual piracy.

American founding father and first U.S. Treasury Secretary Alexander Hamilton advocated rewarding those bringing "improvements and secrets of extraordinary value" into the United States. This was instrumental in making the United States a haven for industrial spies.

=== 20th century ===
East-West commercial development opportunities after World War I saw a rise in Soviet interest in American and European manufacturing know-how, exploited by Amtorg Corporation. Later, with Western restrictions on the export of items thought likely to increase military capabilities to the USSR, Soviet industrial espionage was a well known adjunct to other spying activities up until the 1980s. BYTE reported in April 1984, for example, that although the Soviets sought to develop their own microelectronics, their technology appeared to be several years behind the West's. Soviet CPUs required multiple chips and appeared to be close or exact copies of American products such as the Intel 3000 and DEC LSI-11/2. (Note: These technologies, however, were not streamlined or industrialized. Some of these findings were applied on plants used to produce chips for military purposes.)

==== "Operation Brunnhilde" ====
Some of these activities were directed via the East German Stasi (Ministry for State Security). One such operation, "Operation Brunnhilde," operated from the mid-1950s until early 1966 and made use of spies from many Communist Bloc countries. Through at least 20 forays, many western European industrial secrets were compromised. One member of the "Brunnhilde" ring was a Swiss chemical engineer, Dr. Jean Paul Soupert (also known as "Air Bubble"), living in Brussels. He was described by Peter Wright in Spycatcher as having been "doubled" by the Belgian Sûreté de l'État. He revealed information about industrial espionage conducted by the ring, including the fact that Russian agents had obtained details of Concorde's advanced electronics system. He testified against two Kodak employees, living and working in Britain, during a trial in which they were accused of passing information on industrial processes to him, though they were eventually acquitted.

According to a 2020 American Economic Review study, East German industrial espionage in West Germany significantly reduced the gap in total factor productivity between the two countries.

==== Soviet spetsinformatsiya system ====
A secret report from the Military-Industrial Commission of the USSR (VPK), from 1979 to 1980, detailed how spetsinformatsiya (Russian: специнформация, "special records") could be used in twelve different military industrial areas. Writing in the Bulletin of the Atomic Scientists, Philip Hanson detailed a spetsinformatsiya system in which 12 industrial branch ministries formulated requests for information to aid technological development in their military programs. Acquisition plans were described as operating on 2-year and 5-year cycles with about 3000 tasks underway each year. Efforts were aimed at civilian and military industrial targets, such as in the petrochemical industries. Some information was gathered to compare Soviet technological advancement with that of their competitors. Much unclassified information was also gathered, blurring the boundary with "competitive intelligence".

The Soviet military was recognised as making much better use of acquired information than civilian industries, where their record in replicating and developing industrial technology was poor. (Note: This may be explained by the fact that the defense industry was supported better than a civil one.)

=== Legacy of Cold War espionage ===
Following the demise of the Soviet Union and the end of the Cold War, commentators, including the US Congressional Intelligence Committee, noted a redirection amongst the espionage community from military to industrial targets, with Western and former communist countries making use of "underemployed" spies and expanding programs directed at stealing information.

The legacy of Cold War spying included not just the redirection of personnel but the use of spying apparatus such as computer databases, scanners for eavesdropping, spy satellites, bugs and wires.

=== Industrial espionage as part of US foreign policy ===
Former CIA Director Stansfield Turner stated in 1991, "as we increase emphasis on securing economic intelligence, we will have to spy on the more developed countries—our allies and friends with whom we compete economically—but to whom we turn first for political and military assistance in a crisis. This means that rather than instinctively reaching for human, on-site spying, the United States will want to look to those impersonal technical systems, primarily satellite photography and intercepts".

Former CIA Director James Woolsey acknowledged in 2000 that the United States steals economic secrets from foreign firms and their governments "with espionage, with communications, with reconnaissance satellites". He listed the three reasons as understanding whether sanctions are functioning for countries under sanction, monitoring dual-use technology that could be used to produce or develop weapons, and to spy on bribery.

In 2013 The United States was accused of spying on Brazilian oil company Petrobras. Brazil's President Dilma Rousseff stated that it was tantamount to industrial espionage and had no security justification.

In 2014 former US intelligence officer Edward Snowden stated that the National Security Agency (NSA) was engaged in industrial espionage and that they spied on German companies that compete with US firms. He also highlighted the fact the NSA uses mobile phone apps such as Angry Birds to gather personal data.

According to a 2014 Glenn Greenwald article, "potentially sabotaging another country's hi-tech industries and their top companies has long been a sanctioned American strategy." The article was based on a leaked report issued from former U.S. Director of National Intelligence James R. Clapper's office that evaluated how intelligence could be used to overcome a loss of the United States' technological and innovative edge. When contacted, the Director of National Intelligence office responded, "the United States—unlike our adversaries—does not steal proprietary corporate information", and insisted that "the Intelligence Community regularly engages in analytic exercises". The report, he said, "is not intended to be, and is not, a reflection of current policy or operations".

In September 2019, security firm Qi An Xin published report linking the CIA to a series of attacks targeting Chinese aviation agencies between 2012 and 2017.

==== Seizure and Acquisition of Foreign Patents (World War II and Post-War Era) ====
A significant, state-sponsored transfer of technology occurred during and after World War II, when the U.S. government formally seized patent rights from Axis powers like Germany and Italy. This was followed by programs such as the Technical Industrial Intelligence Committee (TIIC) under the Department of Commerce, which actively dispatched missions to Europe—particularly Germany—to investigate, document, and acquire technical processes and patents. This systematic effort also extended to Allied nations; financially exhausted European countries, including the United Kingdom, were often compelled to make 'voluntary transfers' of intellectual property as a condition for aid or loans. Historians have argued that this large-scale acquisition of foreign intellectual property was a key factor in the post-war technological and industrial ascendancy of the United States, which subsequently licensed much of this Intellectual Property back to European firms.

=== Israel's economic espionage in the United States ===
Israel has an active program to gather proprietary information within the United States. These collection activities are primarily directed at obtaining information on military systems and advanced computing applications that can be used in Israel's sizable armaments industry.

Israel was accused by the US government of selling US military technology and secrets to China in 1993.

In 2014 American counter-intelligence officials told members of the House Judiciary and Foreign Affairs committees that Israel's current espionage activities in America are "unrivaled".

== Use of computers and the Internet ==
=== Personal computers ===
Computers have become key in exercising industrial espionage due to the enormous amount of information they contain and the ease at which it can be copied and transmitted. The use of computers for espionage increased rapidly in the 1990s. Information has commonly been stolen by individuals posing as subsidiary workers, such as cleaners or repairmen, gaining access to unattended computers and copying information from them. Laptops were, and still are, a prime target, with those traveling abroad on business being warned not to leave them for any period of time. Perpetrators of espionage have been known to find many ways of conning unsuspecting individuals into parting, often only temporarily, from their possessions, enabling others to access and steal information. A "bag-op" refers to the use of hotel staff to access data, such as through laptops, in hotel rooms. Information may be stolen in transit, in taxis, at airport baggage counters, baggage carousels, on trains and so on.

=== The Internet ===
The rise of the Internet and computer networks has expanded the range and detail of information available and the ease of access for the purpose of industrial espionage. This type of operation is generally identified as state backed or sponsored, because the "access to personal, financial or analytic resources" identified exceed that which could be accessed by cyber criminals or individual hackers. Sensitive military or defense engineering or other industrial information may not have immediate monetary value to criminals, compared with, say, bank details. Analysis of cyberattacks suggests deep knowledge of networks, with targeted attacks, obtained by numerous individuals operating in a sustained organized way.

=== Opportunities for sabotage ===
The rising use of the internet has also extended opportunities for industrial espionage with the aim of sabotage. In the early 2000s, energy companies were increasingly coming under attack from hackers. Energy power systems, doing jobs like monitoring power grids or water flow, once isolated from the other computer networks, were now being connected to the internet, leaving them more vulnerable, having historically few built-in security features. The use of these methods of industrial espionage have increasingly become a concern for governments, due to potential attacks by hostile foreign governments or terrorist groups.

=== Malware ===
One of the means of perpetrators conducting industrial espionage is by exploiting vulnerabilities in computer software. Malware and spyware are "tool[s] for industrial espionage", in "transmitting digital copies of trade secrets, customer plans, future plans and contacts". Newer forms of malware include devices which surreptitiously switch on mobile phones camera and recording devices. In attempts to tackle such attacks on their intellectual property, companies are increasingly keeping important information "off network," leaving an "air gap", with some companies building Faraday cages to shield from electromagnetic or cellphone transmissions.

=== Distributed denial of service (DDoS) attack ===
The distributed denial of service (DDoS) attack uses compromised computer systems to orchestrate a flood of requests on the target system, causing it to shut down and deny service to other users. It could potentially be used for economic or industrial espionage with the purpose of sabotage. This method was allegedly used by Russian secret services, over a period of two weeks on a cyberattack on Estonia in May 2007, in response to the removal of a Soviet era war memorial.

== Notable cases ==
=== East India Company ===
In 1848, the British East India Company (EIC) broke Qing China's global near-monopoly on tea production by smuggling Chinese tea out of the country and copying Chinese tea-making processes. The British had fallen into a considerable trade deficit with China due to heavily importing tea and other commodities from Chinese retailers, and attempted to rectify the deficit by trading opium, but encountered difficulties after the Daoguang Emperor banned the opium trade and the First Opium War broke out. To avoid having to buy tea from China, the EIC hired the Scottish botanist Robert Fortune to travel to China under the guise of a Chinese merchant and obtain trade secrets and tea plants for replanting. Infiltrating Chinese tea-making facilities, Fortune recorded Chinese processes for creating tea and smuggled tea leaves and seed out of China. The East India Company later introduced these methods to British India, which soon surpassed China in tea production.

=== France and the United States ===
Between 1987 and 1989, IBM and Texas Instruments were thought to have been targeted by French DGSE with the intention of helping France's Groupe Bull. In 1993, U.S. aerospace companies were also thought to have been targeted by French interests. During the early 1990s, France was described as one of the most aggressive pursuers of espionage to garner foreign industrial and technological secrets. France accused the U.S. of attempting to sabotage its high tech industrial base. The government of France allegedly continues to conduct ongoing industrial espionage against American aerodynamics and satellite companies.

=== Volkswagen ===
In 1993, car manufacturer Opel, the German division of General Motors, accused Volkswagen of industrial espionage after Opel's chief of production, Jose Ignacio Lopez, and seven other executives moved to Volkswagen. Volkswagen subsequently threatened to sue for defamation, resulting in a four-year legal battle. The case, which was finally settled in 1997, resulted in one of the largest settlements in the history of industrial espionage, with Volkswagen agreeing to pay General Motors $100 million and to buy at least $1 billion of car parts from the company over 7 years, although it did not explicitly apologize for Lopez's behavior.

=== Hilton and Starwood ===
In April 2009, Starwood accused its rival Hilton Worldwide of a "massive" case of industrial espionage. After being acquired by The Blackstone Group, Hilton employed 10 managers and executives from Starwood. Starwood accused Hilton of stealing corporate information relating to its luxury brand concepts, used in setting up its Denizen hotels. Specifically, former head of its luxury brands group, Ron Klein, was accused of downloading "truckloads of documents" from a laptop to his personal email account.

=== Amazon ===
Amazon is alleged to have used a 75% owned shell company ("Big River") to perform corporate espionage on its rivals eBay, Shopify, and Walmart.

=== Google and Operation Aurora ===
On 13 January 2010, Google announced that operators, from within China, had hacked into their Google China operation, stealing intellectual property and, in particular, accessing the email accounts of human rights activists. The attack was thought to have been part of a more widespread cyber attack on companies within China which has become known as Operation Aurora. Intruders were thought to have launched a zero-day attack, exploiting a weakness in the Microsoft Internet Explorer browser, the malware used being a modification of the trojan "Hydraq". Concerned about the possibility of hackers taking advantage of this previously unknown weakness in Internet Explorer, the governments of Germany and, subsequently France, issued warnings not to use the browser.

There was speculation that "insiders" had been involved in the attack, with some Google China employees being denied access to the company's internal networks after the company's announcement. In February 2010, computer experts from the U.S. National Security Agency claimed that the attacks on Google probably originated from two Chinese universities associated with expertise in computer science, Shanghai Jiao Tong University and the Shandong Lanxiang Vocational School, the latter having close links to the Chinese military.

Google claimed at least 20 other companies had also been targeted in the cyber attack, said by the London Times, to have been part of an "ambitious and sophisticated attempt to steal secrets from unwitting corporate victims" including "defence contractors, finance and technology companies". Rather than being the work of individuals or organised criminals, the level of sophistication of the attack was thought to have been "more typical of a nation state". Some commentators speculated as to whether the attack was part of what is thought to be a concerted Chinese industrial espionage operation aimed at getting "high-tech information to jump-start China's economy". Critics pointed to what was alleged to be a lax attitude to the intellectual property of foreign businesses in China, letting them operate but then seeking to copy or reverse engineer their technology for the benefit of Chinese "national champions". In Google's case, they may have (also) been concerned about the possible misappropriation of source code or other technology for the benefit of Chinese rival Baidu. In March 2010 Google subsequently decided to cease offering censored results in China, leading to the closing of its Chinese operation.

=== USA v. Lan Lee, et al. ===
The United States charged two former NetLogic Inc. engineers, Lan Lee and Yuefei Ge, of committing economic espionage against TSMC and NetLogic, Inc. A jury acquitted the defendants of the charges with regard to TSMC and deadlocked on the charges with regard to NetLogic. In May 2010, a federal judge dismissed all the espionage charges against the two defendants. The judge ruled that the U.S. government presented no evidence of espionage.

== Concerns of national governments ==
=== Brazil ===
Revelations from the Snowden documents have provided information to the effect that the United States, notably vis-à-vis the NSA, has been conducting aggressive economic espionage against Brazil. Canadian intelligence has apparently supported U.S. economic espionage efforts.

=== China ===
The Chinese cybersecurity company Qihoo 360 accused the Central Intelligence Agency of the United States of an 11-year-long hacking campaign that targeted several industries including aviation organizations, scientific research institutions, petroleum firms, internet companies, and government agencies.

=== United States ===
A 2009 report to the US government, by aerospace and defense company Northrop Grumman, describes Chinese economic espionage as comprising "the single greatest threat to U.S. technology". Blogging on the 2009 cyber attack on Google, Joe Stewart of SecureWorks referred to a "persistent campaign of 'espionage-by-malware' emanating from the People's Republic of China (PRC)" with both corporate and state secrets being "Shanghaied". The Northrop Grumman report states that the collection of US defense engineering data stolen through cyberattacks is regarded as having "saved the recipient of the information years of R&D and significant amounts of funding". Concerns about the extent of cyberattacks has led to the situation being described as the dawn of a "new cold cyberwar".

According to Edward Snowden, the National Security Agency spies on foreign companies. In June 2015 Wikileaks published documents about the National Security Agency spying on French companies.

=== United Kingdom ===
During December 2007, it was suddenly revealed that Jonathan Evans, head of the United Kingdom's MI5, had sent out confidential letters to 300 chief executives and security chiefs at the country's banks, accountants and legal firms warning of attacks from Chinese 'state organisations'. A summary was also posted on the secure website of the Centre for the Protection of the National Infrastructure, accessed by some of the nation's 'critical infrastructure' companies, including 'telecoms firms, banks and water and electricity companies'. One security expert warned about the use of 'custom trojans,' software specifically designed to hack into a particular firm and feed back data. Whilst China was identified as the country most active in the use of internet spying, up to 120 other countries were said to be using similar techniques. The Chinese government responded to UK accusations of economic espionage by saying that the report of such activities was 'slanderous' and that the government opposed hacking which is prohibited by law.

=== Germany ===
German counter-intelligence experts have maintained the German economy is losing around €53 billion or the equivalent of 30,000 jobs to economic espionage yearly.

In Operation Eikonal, German BND agents received "selector lists" from the NSA – search terms for their dragnet surveillance. They contain IP addresses, mobile phone numbers and email accounts with the BND surveillance system containing hundreds of thousands and possibly more than a million such targets. These lists have been subject of controversy as in 2008 it was revealed that they contained some terms targeting the European Aeronautic Defence and Space Company (EADS), the Eurocopter project as well as French administration, which were first noticed by BND employees in 2005. After the revelations made by whistleblower Edward Snowden, the BND decided to investigate the issue whose October 2013 conclusion was that at least 2,000 of these selectors were aimed at Western European or even German interests which has been a violation of the Memorandum of Agreement that the US and Germany signed in 2002 in the wake of the 9/11 terror attacks. After reports emerged in 2014 that EADS and Eurocopter had been surveillance targets the Left Party and the Greens filed an official request to obtain evidence of the violations.

The BND's project group charged with supporting the NSA investigative committee in German parliament set up in spring 2014, reviewed the selectors and discovered 40,000 suspicious search parameters, including espionage targets in Western European governments and numerous companies. The group also confirmed suspicions that the NSA had systematically violated German interests and concluded that the Americans could have perpetrated economic espionage directly under the Germans' noses. The investigative parliamentary committee was not granted access to the NSA's selectors list as an appeal led by opposition politicians failed at Germany's top court. Instead the ruling coalition appointed an administrative judge, Kurt Graulich, as a "person of trust" who was granted access to the list and briefed the investigative commission on its contents after analyzing the 40,000 parameters. In his almost 300-paged report Graulich concluded that European government agencies were targeted massively and that Americans hence broke contractual agreements. He also found that German targets which received special protection from surveillance of domestic intelligence agencies by Germany's Basic Law (Grundgesetz) − including numerous enterprises based in Germany – were featured in the NSA's wishlist in a surprising plenitude.

== Competitive intelligence and economic or industrial espionage ==
"Competitive intelligence" involves the legal and ethical activity of systematically gathering, analyzing and managing information on industrial competitors. It may include activities such as examining newspaper articles, corporate publications, websites, patent filings, specialised databases, information at trade shows and the like to determine information on a corporation. The compilation of these crucial elements is sometimes termed CIS or CRS, a Competitive Intelligence Solution or Competitive Response Solution, with its roots in market research. Douglas Bernhardt has characterised "competitive intelligence" as involving "the application of principles and practices from military and national intelligence to the domain of global business"; it is the commercial equivalent of open-source intelligence.

The difference between competitive intelligence and economic or industrial espionage is not clear; one needs to understand the legal basics to recognize how to draw the line between the two.

== See also ==
- American Economic Espionage Act of 1996
- Business intelligence
- Corporate warfare
- Cyber spying
- FBI
- Genetically modified maize § Corporate espionage
- History of tea in India
- Labor spying in the United States
- Reverse engineering

== Bibliography ==
=== Books ===
- Benny, Daniel J. (2014). Industrial Espionage: Developing a Counterespionage Program. Boca Raton, FL: CRC Press. ISBN 9781466568143.
- DeWeese, Steve; Krekel, Bryan; Bakos, George; Barnet, Christopher (9 October 2009). Capability of the People's Republic of Conduct Cyber Warfare and Computer Network Exploitation: Prepared for The US-China Economic and Security Review Commission (PDF). McLean, Virginia, USA: Northrop Grumman Corporation. Archived from the original (PDF) on 3 February 2011.
- Harris, John (1998). Industrial Espionage and Technology Transfer: Britain and France in the Eighteenth Century. Aldershot: Ashgate Publishing Limited. p. 680. ISBN 0-7546-0367-9.
- Nasheri, Hedieh (2005). Economic Espionage and Industrial Spying. Cambridge: Cambridge University Press. p. 270. ISBN 0-521-54371-1.
- Navarro, Peter; Autry, Greg (15 January 2010). "China's war on the U.S. economy". San Francisco Chronicle. Archived from the original on 18 January 2010.
- Rowe, William; Brook, Timothy (2009). China's Last Empire: The Great Qing. Cambridge, Massachusetts: The Belknap Press of Harvard University Press. p. 368. ISBN 978-0-674-03612-3.
- Wright, Peter (1987). Spycatcher. New York: Viking. p. 270. ISBN 0-521-54371-1.

=== Newspapers and journals ===
- Ahmed, Murad (18 January 2010). "Google cyber-attack from China 'an inside job'". The Times.
- "Chinese stealth fighter jet may use US technology". The Guardian. London. Associated Press. 23 January 2011.
- Beaumont, Claudine (18 January 2010). "Google China hacks 'a possible inside job'". The Daily Telegraph. Archived from the original on 3 December 2010.
- Blakely, Rhys (1 December 2007). "MI5 alert on China's cyberspace spy threat". The Times. Archived from the original on 12 May 2008.
- Blakely, Rhys (5 December 2007). "China says it is cyber-espionage victim". The Times.
- Boggon, Steve (1 January 1996). "The spy who loved me (and my laptop)". The Independent. London.
- Branigan, Tania (13 January 2010). "Google to end censorship in China over cyber attacks". The Guardian.
- Clark, Andrew (17 April 2009). "Starwood sues Hilton for 'stealing trade secrets'". The Guardian. London.
- Dongxiau Yue, et al., v. Chordiant Software, Inc., No. C08-00019 JW U.S. (In the United States District Court for the Northern District of California San Jose Division. 14 May 2010).
- Hanson, Philip (April 1987), "Soviet industrial espionage", Bulletin of the Atomic Scientists, 43 (3): 25–29, Bibcode:1987BuAtS..43c..25H, doi:10.1080/00963402.1987.11459504
- Palmer, Raymond (1974), "Espionage threat to British industry: Spies don't only operate in books and films. They can be for real. And their target might be your industrial secrets", Industrial Management and Data Systems, 74 (7/8)
- Piller, Charles (8 July 2002). "Hackers Target Energy Industry". Los Angeles Times.
- "Volkswagen Sues GM for $6.6 Million, Accusing U.S. Firm of Defamation". Los Angeles Times. Reuters. 12 May 1996.
- "Google probes possible inside help on China attack". The Globe and Mail. Toronto. Reuters. 13 January 2010.
- Rogin, Josh (14 January 2010). "China's expansion of economic espionage boils over". Foreign Policy.
- "Air France Denies Spying on Travellers". The New York Times. 14 September 1991. Archived from the original on 16 October 2015.
- Nodoushani, Omid; Nodoushani, Patricia A (April 2002), "Industrial Espionage: The Dark Side of the "Digital Age"", Competitiveness Review, 12 (2): 96–101, doi:10.1108/eb046445
- Harvey, Mike (16 January 2010). "China accused of cyber attack on Google and 'global industrial targets'". The Times.
- Jehl, Douglas (30 April 1993). "U.S. Expanding Its Effort to Halt Spying by Allies". The New York Times.
- Lawson, Dominic (17 January 2010). "Be afraid, China, the Google dragon stirs". The Times. Archived from the original on 25 May 2010.
- Lohr, Steve (18 January 2010). "Companies Fight Endless War Against Computer Attacks". The New York Times.
- Markoff, John; Barboza, David (18 February 2010). "2 China Schools Said to Be Tied to Online Attacks". The New York Times.
- Meredith, Robyn (9 January 1997). "VW Agrees To Pay G.M. $100 Million in Espionage Suit". The New York Times.

=== Web ===
- Levine, Dan (24 May 2010). "Federal Judge Trashes Novel Economic Espionage Case". Law.com.
- Scalet, Sarah D (1 May 2003). "Corporate Spying: Snooping, by Hook or by Crook" (web page). CSO Security and Risk.
- Stewart, Joe (19 January 2010). "Operation Aurora: Clues in the Code". Secureworks.com. Secureworks.
- Office of the Assistant Secretary of Defense (Command, Control, Communications, and Intelligence). "Annual Polygraph Report to Congress (2002 Fiscal Year)". Department of Defense. Archived from the original on 24 September 2015.
- Anderson, Nate (14 May 2007). "Massive DDoS attacks target Estonia; Russia accused". Ars Technica.
