= Goojje =

Spoof website

Goojje technology Co., LTD 深圳谷姐科技有限公司
- Type: Private
- Industry: Friends Communication
- Founded: 2010
- Founder: Huang Jiongxuan
- Headquarters: Room 401, Block A of Digital mansion, No.1079, the South China Sea Avenue of Shekou, Nanshan District, Shenzhen. 深圳市南山区蛇口南海大道1079号数码大厦A座401, Shenzhen, China
- Key people: Huang Jiongxuan(Chairman)
- Products: Goojje; Goojje Search Engine, Tiaotiao Net(挑挑网), Famous Club（红人馆）
- Services: Offering platform for making friends
- Website: goojje.com (Archived)

Goojje (Chinese: 谷姐; pinyin: Gǔjiě, IPA: [ku˧˥tɕjɛ˨˩]) was a spoof website of Google China, which encouraged the real site to stay online and comply with Internet censorship in the People's Republic of China. The site was created after Google executives publicly threatened to shut down the Chinese site following the Operation Aurora cyber attack on Google China, which some computer security experts believe may have come from within China as in the GhostNet cyber spying operation. Google China executives had also publicly condemned the necessity of filtering search results in line with the Golden Shield Project (also known as the Great Firewall of China), which some commentators have stated appears to run counter to Google's mantra, Don't be evil.

Goojje, founded on January 14, 2010 also allowed searches to be run, but apparently uses Google and Baidu to do the actual searches. Google has demanded that Goojje stop using its logo, but Goojje refused until 2011.

== Origin ==
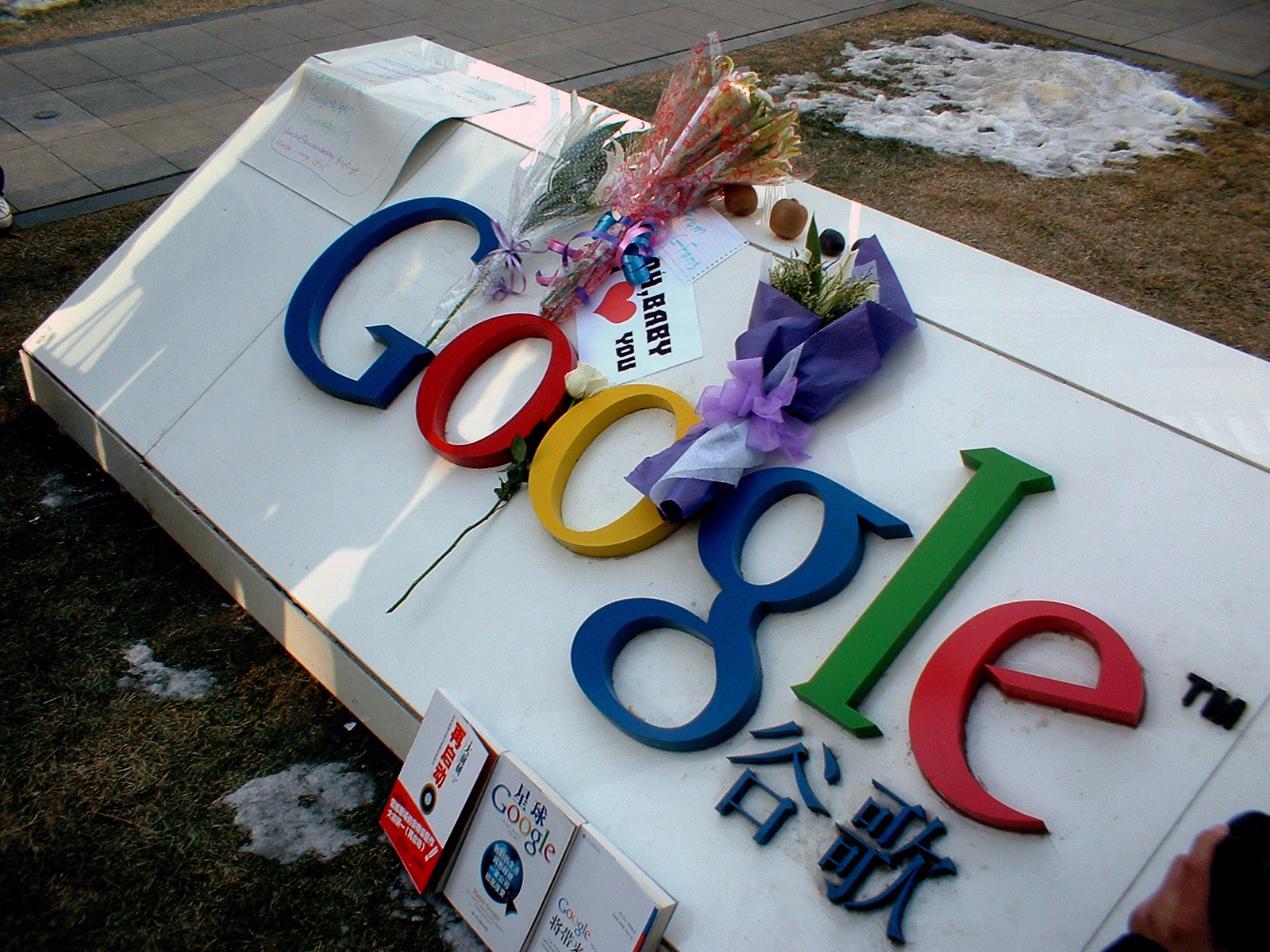
Illegal flower tribute (非法献花) left outside Google China's headquarters after its announcement it may leave the country

Google in Chinese is 谷歌 (pinyin: Gǔgē), a transcription without regard to its meaning of "valley song". The Chinese name of Goojje can be interpreted as having meaning of "the sister of Google". The jje phoneme is from the word for sister, "jie jie (姐姐)", which mirrors how Google's last syllable (歌) sounds like "ge ge (哥哥)" (brother).

It is said that Goojje was created by a female who is infatuated with Google. Due to Google's withdrawal from China, she decided to build Goojje in memory of it. The website's propaganda is "Goojje it, loneliness all eliminated".

== Staff ==
All staff members of Goojje were born in the generation after the 1980s. Goojje appears to be run by just one person, Huang Jiongxuan, a female college student from Guangdong. Huang stated in February 2010 that the website had yet to turn a profit; however, as of February 2016, it was estimated to have a net worth of US$235.

== Development history of Goojje ==
1. January 14, 2010: Goojje set up, presenting a new concept: search engine combined with social networking.
2. January 16, 2010: Goojje creates motivational video of 2010 with network materials.
3. January 20, 2010: Slogan "Goojje it, loneliness all eliminated" becomes an Internet meme.
4. January 21, 2010: Goojje network team A1 established with 30 team members.
5. January 22, 2010: Goojje breaks through the 1.5 million page view milestone, with the world ranking down to 50,000.
6. January 24, 2010: members of network team A1 reaches 600.
7. January 25, 2010: Goojje reaches 50,000 registered members. Receives news coverage in more than 100 major media channels.
8. January 28, 2010: Goojje begins to attract international attention.
9. January 30, 2010: Goojje records more than 2.2 million page views, world ranking goes down to 15,000.
10. February 2, 2010: Website undergoes a major revision.
11. February 4, 2010: Goojje attacked by unknown hackers. Website down for two weeks
12. March 11, 2010: Club of Goojje is online formally.
13. March 20, 2010: Goojje headquarters established.
14. April 10, 2010: Goojje technology Co., LTD formally established.
15. May 20, 2010: Goojje signes with several media companies to establish strategic partnership.

== Goojje's Channel Column ==
- Goojje Information (Chinese: 谷姐资讯)
- Goojje Hot (Chinese: 谷姐热点)
- Goojje Community (Chinese: 谷姐社区)
- Goojje Intranet (Chinese: 谷姐内网)
- Goojje Poll (Chinese: 谷姐投票)
- Goojje Chatterbox (Chinese: 谷姐水区)
- Goojje Suggestion (Chinese: 谷姐建议)

== See also ==
- Intellectual property in the People's Republic of China
