= Google Music Search =

Music search service by Google China

- Native name: 谷歌音乐搜索
- Website type: Music search engine
- Available in: Simplified Chinese
- Dissolved: September 2012
- Country of origin: China
- Owners: Google China (Google); content and streaming/download service operated by Top100.cn (Orca Digital)
- Website: www.google.cn/music/homepage
- Commercial: Yes
- Registration: Optional
- Launched: August 5, 2008 (beta); March 30, 2009 (official)
- Current status: Defunct

Google Music Search (谷歌音乐搜索) was a music search service developed and operated by Google China between 2008 and 2012. In partnership with Orca Digital, operator of the site Top100.cn, it offered mainland Chinese users free streaming and downloads of over a million record-label-licensed songs, with the advertising revenue generated from listening shared between Orca Digital and the record labels.

The service was one of the localization projects led by Kai-Fu Lee at Google China. It was launched to offer licensed music under a "free + advertising" model in a Chinese online music market flooded with pirated music, competing with unauthorized-download services such as Baidu MP3. Google Music Search once brought substantial traffic to both Google China and Top100.cn, but after a series of changes — including Lee's departure and Google's 2010 shutdown of its search service in mainland China — the service gradually became marginalized. It ultimately closed in September 2012 after failing to become profitable and after its "impact fell short of expectations." Top100.cn itself ceased operations the following year due to a sharp drop in traffic and financial difficulties.

== Background ==
In the 2000s, China's online music market was rife with piracy; internet users could easily download unauthorized music through services such as Baidu MP3. Guo Quji, then Google China's Chief Strategy Officer, and others believed that music search was central to Baidu's ability to compete for younger users. After acquiring the popular music player software Qianqian Jingting in 2006, Baidu used music search to further widen its traffic lead over Google.

Kai-Fu Lee joined Google in July 2005 and established the Google China Engineering Research Institute in Beijing. Court documents showed that Google planned to launch two "killer projects" for the Chinese market within three to six months of the China research center's establishment, and viewed the lack of MP3 search, integrated news content, and pinyin input search as competitive weaknesses relative to Baidu. According to data from Analysys International, Google's share of China's search engine market came second with a 25.9 percent share in fourth quarter of 2007, lagging behind Baidu's 60.1% share.

Orca Digital was founded by Gary Chen in March 2006, with $3 million in startup investment from Yao Ming and his agent Zhang Mingji. At launch, its site Top100.cn offered paid music downloads, charging roughly 1 RMB per song download. Gary Chen later came to realize he needed to find a free business model.

== History ==
=== 2006–2008: Investing in Orca Digital, project preparation ===
Preparation for Google Music Search took more than two years. Kai-Fu Lee, then President of Greater China at Google, began developing the concept of a China-focused music service in 2006. The idea for the music service was inspired by Baidu MP3, a copyright-controversial music download service that brought Baidu Search substantial traffic, at one point accounting for as much as 30% of Baidu's total traffic.

Lee assembled a team to plan the music search service, including then-Chief Strategy Officer Guo Quji, Global Engineering Director Lin Bin, and product manager Hong Feng. The team initially struggled to settle on a business model. After Guo Quji was introduced to Gary Chen through a friend in 2007, the two began discussing a business model for music search, and after a meeting in May they decided to partner on developing a music search service. In November, Lee, Lin Bin, Hong Feng and others finalized the project's business model in a meeting. It was decided that Google would invest in Orca Digital and provide promotional and technical support; Orca Digital would be responsible for securing music rights from record labels; and Google would build an ad-supported music search service using Orca Digital's licensed music catalog, with advertising revenue from listening shared between Orca Digital and the record labels.

Although the music search project faced internal resistance within Google, Lee ultimately persuaded then-CEO Eric Schmidt, and the project received approval from Google's headquarters. With Lee's backing, the project was given considerable priority, and its team grew to more than 20 members. Lin Bin served as project director for Google Music Search and Hong Feng as product manager, while Hu Ning served as technical director.

Once the project had headquarter's approval, the Google China team and Orca Digital began seeking record label partners, with Guo Quji and Gary Chen jointly negotiating with numerous labels. Lee insisted that record labels agree to let users stream and download the music for free. Google prioritized negotiations with the "Big Four" record labels — Warner, EMI, Universal, and Sony. EMI and Universal signed first, followed by Warner. Sony Music was the last of the four to reach an agreement, with negotiations taking a full year and a half; Lee and Gary Chen traveled to New York half a month before the launch of Google Music Search to finalize the partnership with Sony.

=== 2008–2009: Service launch and early development ===
Starting in February 2008, media outlets began reporting rumors that Google might launch a music service in China in partnership with Orca Digital's Top100.cn. On August 5 [2008], Google China and Orca Digital jointly released an experimental version of Google Music Search. Users who searched for a song or artist on Google could click through to Top100.cn to stream or download high-quality, licensed music for free. The service launched with 350,000 downloadable songs, with an already-contracted catalog of 1.1 million songs to be added progressively afterward. By the end of the beta period, the service was providing about 1.5 million streams and downloads per day.

On March 30, 2009, Google Music Search officially launched; the official version added the Songscreener and "Similar Songs" features. Google placed banner ads on the music search and listening pages, with about half of the ad revenue going to record labels and the rest to Orca Digital — Google itself took no cut. The launch event was held the same day, attended by representatives from 140 record labels and over a hundred media outlets, with artists including Jolin Tsai, Jam Hsiao, F.I.R., Joker Xue, Valen Hsu, Huang Yida, and the band AOK attending to offer congratulations. At launch, the music search service had partnerships with all of the "Big Four" global record labels, more than 140 independent labels, the four major international music publishers, and the Music Copyright Society of China, offering users 1.1 million songs for streaming and download.

Kai-Fu Lee revealed that, given China's market conditions, he had initially lacked confidence in the service's success, estimating its chance of success at only 10%. But he believed that if music search could capture enough market share, the free-plus-advertising business model would succeed. Lin Bin told Forbes that their goal was for the service to become profitable within two to two and a half years. Google Music Search began selling branded advertising in late September 2009, delivered through the DoubleClick platform. As of November 2009, five major advertisers had signed on with the music search service, including Nokia, Apple, and Volkswagen, with total advertising value of 2.5 million RMB (about $370,000). Orca Digital and Google projected that 30 advertisers would sign on within six months. By January 2010, the service had sold at least 6 million RMB in advertising. From October 2009 to October 2010, Google Music Search generated a total of 10 million RMB in advertising revenue, 8 million of which came from branded display CPM. Gary Chen hoped the service's revenue would grow to 100 million RMB per year within a few years.

Google Music Search drove substantial traffic to both the Google China website and Top100.cn, recording 22.39 million visits in its first month online. Upon release, about 30% of Google Music Search's users had never previously visited Google. 60%–70% of Top100.cn's traffic was attributable to Google Music Search. Before March 2010, music search accounted for 20%–30% of Google China's total search traffic, and this share continued to grow. As of January 2010, the service averaged 6 million downloads and plays per day. According to Tencent Tech, the Google China team had optimistically projected in early 2009 that, at the service's initial rate of user growth, advertising revenue from Google Music Search would cover Orca Digital's licensing costs by the end of 2010.

In September 2009, Kai-Fu Lee resigned from his position as President of Greater China at Google, and John Liu, then head of Greater China sales, succeeded him. Following this, Google restructured its China product development, sales, and operations, folding localized products into its global product system; Google China's localization strategy also shifted, and its localized products were re-evaluated. In an interview with CBN Weekly, John Liu said the company needed to consider merging Google Music Search with Google's globally launched Music Onebox — a decision that upset Google China's R&D staff.

=== 2010–2012: Challenges and contraction ===
Orca Digital received a second round of investment from Google in June 2010, worth roughly several million US dollars; Yao Ming also contributed an additional investment. According to Tencent Tech, Google's total investment in Orca Digital over time came to $8.91 million.

After Google indicated in January 2010 that it might shut down its Chinese search service and withdraw from China, the future of both Google Music Search and Orca Digital became uncertain. Gary Chen acknowledged that a Google exit would be a major obstacle but said Orca Digital could, in theory, continue operating without Google. He expressed hope that Google and Chinese authorities could reach a compromise that would allow music search to keep functioning. Gary Chen said Orca Digital was in talks with multiple partners but had no plans to seek another search partner to replace Google. In March, Google shut down google.cn's web search service and redirected users to its Hong Kong site. Since then, traffic to Top100.cn from Google began to decline, and according to Chen, Google's advertising sales for Music Search "essentially stopped," severely affecting Orca Digital's ad revenue. Orca Digital's planned Series B investment from China Media Capital (CMC) also fell through in 2011. Lin Bin, the original project director of Google Music Search, and Hong Feng, its product manager, left Google in November and December 2010 respectively to join the newly founded Xiaomi Corporation. Technical director Hu Ning also left Google that September. According to Tencent Tech, by the time Hu Ning left, the music search team had no product manager and was essentially run by Hu Ning alone. According to internal Google email, in the three years leading up to September 2012, "the vast majority" of Google Music Search's engineers had been reassigned to other projects, and the service was "in maintenance mode, with only one engineer devoting 20% of his time" to it.

Seeking to amend the advertising sales contract so that Orca Digital would manage advertising sales on Google Music Search, and to discuss bringing Google's global music service, Google Music, into China, Gary Chen negotiated at Google China's offices "dozens of times" and traveled to Google's US headquarters three times, but without result. Google Music Search ultimately never became profitable — its revenue fell short of covering the licensing fees owed to record labels.

=== 2012: Service shutdown ===
After learning in August 2012 that Google planned to shut down Google Music Search, Gary Chen discussed with Google the possibility of transferring operation of the service to Orca Digital, but without success. In September, Boon-Lock Yeo, general manager of Google China's engineering research office, announced on the Google China blog that Google Music Search would be shut down because the product's "impact had fallen short of expectations." Orca Digital chairman Zhang Mingji revealed that the decision to close the service was made by Google, not requested by Orca Digital. Zhang said that after Google "withdrew from China" in 2010, Google China's traffic declined sharply, which affected music search as well, and that Google China subsequently invested little effort in the service. Gary Chen, for his part, questioned Google's stated reason for the shutdown — that its "impact had fallen short of expectations." Lin Bin, the service's original project director, said he found the shutdown "a pity," though he was also surprised the service had continued to operate as long as it had. Former technical director Hu Ning felt the service's fate had been "sealed the moment Google announced its withdrawal from China."

After Google Music Search shut down, Top100.cn — which had relied heavily on Google for traffic — saw its traffic drop rapidly. Gary Chen attempted to make up the shortfall by partnering with local social media sites, including Kaixin001. At the same time, Orca Digital faced financial difficulties, and the site struggled to cover monthly operating costs of around 600,000 RMB. In 2013, Orca Digital shut down Top100.cn, and Gary Chen subsequently resigned as CEO.

== Service features ==
Google Music Search offered free streaming and downloads of licensed music, and was, at the time, the only large-scale service in the world to offer free streaming and downloads of licensed music. Orca Digital founder Gary Chen believed Google Music Search helped push China's online music industry toward legitimacy.

Unlike similar contemporary services that offered only popularity charts, Google Music Search used algorithms to analyze song characteristics — for example, categorizing songs by genre into pop, jazz, rock, and so on. The service offered two signature features, "Songscreener" and "Similar Songs," which let users explore and discover music. Using "Songscreener," users could discover music by selecting criteria such as tempo, pitch, tone, era, genre, and language; once selections were made, matching songs would appear on the page as colored bubbles. "Similar Songs" listed songs similar to a selected one in melody, rhythm, or tone, or by the same artist or genre, as well as other songs commonly searched by users who had searched for the selected song.

Google Music Search supported login via Renren, Windows Live, Kedou, or Yahoo accounts. Logged-in users could save and share music playlists.
