= Legend Holdings =

Chinese investment holding company

Legend Holdings Corporation
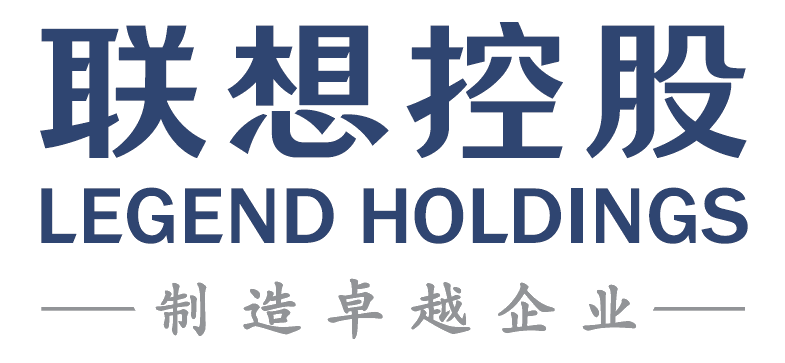
- Native name: 联想控股股份有限公司
- Type: Public
- Traded as: SEHK: 3396
- Founded: 1 January 1984
- Founder: Liu Chuanzhi; Chinese Academy of Sciences
- Headquarters: Tower A, Raycom InfoTech Park; 2 Zhongguancun Academy of Sciences South Road, Beijing, China
- Owner: Chinese Academy of Sciences (29.04%)
- Subsidiaries: Hony Capital; Legend Star iByer Dental; Joyvio; Legend Capital; Lenovo (31.41%); Elac
- Website: legendholdings.com.cn

Legend Holdings Corporation (联想控股股份有限公司) is a Chinese investment holding company with interests in finance, real estate, and information technology, and the controlling shareholder of its better-known associate company, the Lenovo Group. Formed by the Chinese Academy of Sciences, Lenovo was originally Legend Computer, until the English name was changed in 2004. Its Chinese name however remains the same, 联想 (Liánxiǎng).

== Leadership ==
=== Liu Chuanzhi ===
In June 2012, Liu stepped down as chairman of Legend Holdings, the parent company of Lenovo. In the years just prior to his resignation, Liu focused on improving Legend's growth, building-up its core assets, and issue a public offering of stock between 2014 and 2016. Legend's major assets include Lenovo, Legend Capital, a real-estate venture called Raycom, Digital China, and Hony Capital.

In an interview with the BBC, Liu said that his vision for Legend is for it "to become an industry in it its own right" and that he wants it "to be become the top enterprise across industries...not only in China, but in the whole world." Liu said that he realises that his vision is extremely ambitious and may have to be left to his successors to implement.

Liu said in an interview with Forbes that he hopes to diversify away from IT-related businesses and that Legend Holding's assets will be focused mainly on information technology, real estate, services, coal processing, and agriculture. He said agriculture "will become the next strategic development area for Legend Holdings." Liu says agriculture is just one part of what he sees as "huge" opportunities in sectors that cater to Chinese consumers. In the same interview, Liu said that Legend's focus will continue to remain on China. "Whatever we do has to fit into something we are doing in China," said Liu when referring to plans for overseas investment. Liu said in July 2012 that he plans to take Legend Holdings public with a listing in Hong Kong. Forbes speculated that Liu may be trying to "create a Chinese version of General Electric."

== Stock offering ==
As of March 2015, Legend Holdings planned an initial public offering for July of that year to raise about HK$23.4 billion. The firm worked with UBS and China International Capital Corp to submit its IPO application to Hong Kong regulators. In early June 2015, the Hong Kong Stock Exchange approved Legend's planned stock offering. As of this date, Legend said it planned to go through with the offering in late June.

Liu Chuanzhi said in an interview that he plans to carry out a stock offering for Legend on one of China's domestic exchanges before he retires.

== Subsidiaries ==
=== Joyvio ===
Joyvio is Legend Holdings' vehicle for investment in the food industry. Legend has invested more than 1 billion yuan in Joyvio. Joyvio will pursue complete vertical integration from farming all the way to retailing. Joyvio's first product was blueberries. In November 2013, its product range was expanded to kiwifruit. The kiwifruit has been branded "Liu Kiwi" in honour of Liu Chuanzhi. Liu is responsible for Legend's move into food. Since 2011 Joyvio has been acquiring farms around the world including blueberry farms in Shandong and Chile and kiwifruit farms in Sichuan, Shaanxi, Henan, and Chile. The firm has plans to start selling cherries and grapes from the United States, Australia, and Chile by the end of 2013.

Joyvio has taken advantage of Legend's experience in information technology to set up a tracking system to ensure the quality and safety of its products. Customers can scan codes on its packages in order to find out what farm the product came from, who supervised production, what tests were performed, and information on the soil and water quality. The company is also applying the original design manufacture business model common in the technology industry in order to work effectively with small family farms and agricultural cooperatives. Joyvio holds training exercises with farmers in order to prepare them to deal quickly and effectively with bad weather.

Joyvio entered the imported wine business in late 2013.

Joyvio announced on 30 March 2014 that it had acquired a 60 percent share of Hangzhou Longguan Tea Industrial Company for roughly 30 million yuan or about US$4.83 million. Longguan was previously a fully state-owned enterprise operating under the jurisdiction of the Chinese Academy of Agricultural Sciences. Longguan produces Hangzhou's famous Longjing tea. The company had sales of 32.45 million yuan in 2012. According to the company's annual report it has been growing 40 to 50 percent per year. Joyvio has taken over day-to-day control of Longguan. Liu Chuanzhi said he aims to bring innovation and commercial methods to the tea industry. Liu said that Joyvio would invest in other well-known tea brands and related products.

=== iByer Dental ===
In 2014 Legend invested 1 billion yuan (US$160 million) in iByer Dental, a twenty-year-old chain of dental clinics, "to help iBYER Dental to join premium dental brands in the country." As of July 2014, Legend planned to double iByer's size to 200 locations over three years. Legend's move into healthcare was facilitated by recently implemented healthcare reform legislation designed to encourage private investment. Legend said it expects healthcare spending in China to triple to US$1 trillion by 2020 due to an aging population, an increase in non-communicable diseases acquired through lifestyle, and an increased interest in health due to higher incomes. China has the lowest number of dentists per capita among the G20.

=== Legend Star ===
Legend Star began as a joint venture between Legend Holdings and the Chinese Academy of Sciences in 2008. Since then, Legend Star has become a full-stack early stage investment firm focusing on the commercialization of technology, with roughly 200 portfolio companies spread across a range of sectors. Legend Star also operates a training program for entrepreneurs (typically CEO's of venture-backed technology startups) and has graduated around 600 alumni in its 7 years of operation.

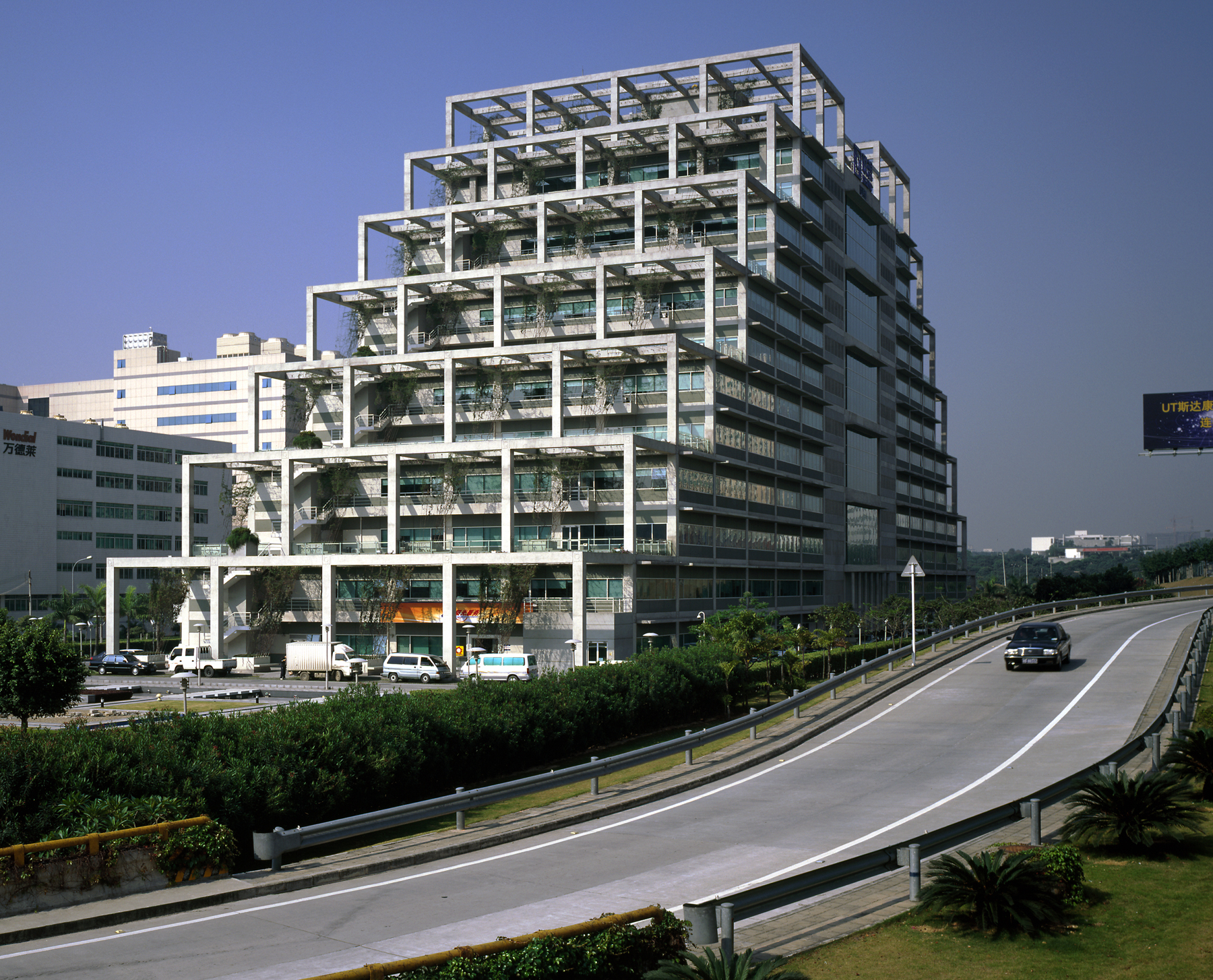
Legend Computer (now Lenovo) Headquarters in Shenzhen, China. Designed by Lee/Timchula Architects as part of the modernization of Shenzhen

=== Lenovo ===
Lenovo is a Chinese multinational computer technology company with global headquarters in Beijing, and operational centres in Singapore, and Morrisville, North Carolina, United States. It designs, develops, manufactures and sells personal computers, tablet computers, smartphones, workstations, servers, electronic storage devices, IT management software and smart televisions. In 2014, Lenovo was the world's largest personal computer vendor by unit sales. It markets the ThinkPad line of notebook computers and the ThinkCentre line of desktops.

Legend Holdings is the largest shareholder of Lenovo, holding 30.6 percent of Lenovo's equity.

=== Hony Capital ===
Legend Holdings provided Hony, a pioneer in China's private equity industry, with its start-up capital. Hony has about US$7 billion under management. According to Hony, its core strategy is to invest in large state-owned enterprises and restructure them to increase profits. Hony also invests in overseas consumer brands in order to create value by expanding their presence in China. Investors in Hony's private equity funds include numerous American and Canadian pension funds, the Bill & Melinda Gates Foundation, Goldman Sachs, and China's national social insurance fund.

Hony owns a majority stake in the Hollywood movie studio, STX Entertainment. Hony invested together with TPG Capital of the United States in STX. STX is run by Hollywood producer Robert Simonds. STX movies have included stars such as Matthew McConaughey, Julia Roberts, Adam Sandler, and Drew Barrymore.

=== Peer-to-peer lending ===
In 2014, Legend expanded into peer-to-peer lending and other forms of finance. In September of that year, Legend invested in Yindou. The next month Legend invested in Eloancn, China's first peer-to-peer lending platform. Eloancn has established 1,000 locations in 100 Chinese cities. As of August 2014, Eloancn was facilitating 200 million yuan of loans per month. In a statement Eloancn said that it considered Legend a "strategic investor" and hoped to benefit from Legend's expertise in information technology, management, and marketing.

=== Legend Capital ===
Legend Capital is a venture capital firm headquartered in Beijing. It was founded in 2001. The firm invests primarily in early stage funding rounds of United States and China based companies. It targets the IT, consumer goods, clean technology, health care, equipment manufacturing and digital services sectors.

In 2016 it has invested in a series-A funding for Gfresh.

In 2017 it was reported that the company had invested in 450 companies of which 70 had gone on to IPOs on international markets. It was reported in 2019 that the company managed both USD and RMB based funds that have combined assets under management (AUM) valued at ¥45 billion.
