= Hony Capital =

Chinese private equity firm

- Native name: 弘毅投资
- Type: subsidiary
- Headquarters: Beijing, China
- AUM: US$13 Billion (2023)
- Owner: Legend Holdings
- Website: www.honycapital.com

Hony Capital is a Chinese private equity firm, owned by Legend Holdings. Legend Holdings provided Hony, a pioneer in China's private equity industry, with its start-up capital. Hony has about US$10 billion under management. Hony also invests in overseas consumer brands in order to create value by expanding their presence in China.

Hony Capital has invested in the areas of pharmaceutical and healthcare, consumption and catering, culture and media, environmental protection and new energy, as well as high-end manufacturing. Hony's portfolio companies include China Shijiazhuang Pharmaceutical Group (CSPC), Zoomlion, Shanghai City Investment Holdings, Shanghai Jin Jiang International, ENN, PizzaExpress (UK), STX (US), WeWork (US), etc.

In July 2012, Hony Capital became the first private equity company registered in Qianhai Shenzhen-Hong Kong Modern Service Industry Cooperation Zone. Since 2014, Hony Capital has established Hospital Corporation of China and Best Food Holding Company Limited as its investment management platforms to explore systematic opportunities in healthcare, chain food and beverage industries.

Hony Capital currently manages over US$10.0 billion of assets and has invested in more than 100 companies domestically and abroad.

== Investments ==
In 2008, Hony assisted Zoomlion Heavy Industry Science & Technology to purchase Italian equipment manufacturer Compagnia Italiana Forme Acciaio.

=== PizzaExpress ===
Through its subsidiary Hony Capital, Legend acquired PizzaExpress for US$1.54 billion from private equity fund Cinven in 2014. Hony plans to open hundreds of new PizzaExpress restaurants in China and India. Hony claims it can help PizzaExpress create more value in China using its extensive experience and network in its home market. Hony paid with US$ billion in debt with the remaining amount in equity. JP Morgan acted as Hony's adviser for this transaction.

=== STX Entertainment ===
Hony worked with American buyout firm TPG Capital in 2014 to invest about US$1 billion in a new Hollywood movie studio, STX Entertainment, to make films for worldwide distribution. STX is run by film producer Robert Simonds. The studio produces movies with budgets of $10 million to $80 million. STX says it will release as many as 15 films per year by 2017.

STX has direct distribution agreements with North American theater chains AMC, Regal, Cinemark and Carmike. In January 2015, STX signed a multiyear television output agreement to release its films exclusively to Showtime Networks during the premium television window, beginning in 2015 and covering the studio's theatrical releases through 2019. In April 2015, STX entered into a multi-year partnership with Universal Studios Home Entertainment, with Universal handling marketing, sales and distribution services for Blu-ray, DVD and VOD platforms of STX's theatrical titles in North America.

In January 2015, STX announced its first four films: The Gift, a thriller starring Jason Bateman, Rebecca Hall and Joel Edgerton, and written and directed by Edgerton; Secret in Their Eyes, a remake of the 2009 Argentine film, starring Chiwetel Ejiofor, Nicole Kidman and Julia Roberts, and written and directed by Billy Ray; The Boy, a psychological horror thriller directed by William Brent Bell and starring Lauren Cohan; The Free State of Jones, a Civil War drama starring Matthew McConaughey and written and directed by Gary Ross; and Russ and Roger Go Beyond, starring Will Ferrell and based on the true story of the collaboration between Russ Meyer and Roger Ebert. STX also acquired worldwide rights to the action film Hardcore for $10 million after its premiere at the Toronto International Film Festival, making it the studio's first acquisition.

=== CPSC Pharmaceutical ===
Through firms it controls, Hony Capital sold off about US$1.26 billion in stock in CSPC Pharmaceutical in April 2015 to take advantage of rising share prices. Hony completely divested itself of CSPC Pharmaceutical equity. The shares were sold at prices ranging from HK$7.03 to HK$7.15 each.

=== Santos ===
In November 2015, Hony agreed to increase its minority stake in the Australian oil and gas company Santos for A$500 million. According to regulatory filings, Honey will purchase 75.53 million shares at A$6.8 per share. Santos will use the money to pay off debt and increase its cash balance. Hony paid roughly a 15% premium over market prices and agreed not to divest its shares for at least 12 months. Hony increased its equity in Santos from 1.4% to 7.9% via this transaction.

== Clients ==
Investors in Hony's private equity funds include numerous American and Canadian pension funds, the Bill & Melinda Gates Foundation, Goldman Sachs, and China's national social insurance fund.

== Leadership ==
Hony Capital is led by John Zhao, its founder and CEO, who also serves as Executive Vice President of Legend Holdings.
