= Gfresh =

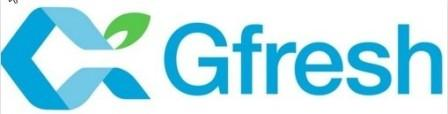
- Company type: Private
- Industry: Online Seafood
- Founded: 2014; 12 years ago
- Headquarters: China
- Services: Online Seafood Marketplace
- Website: gfresh.com

Gfresh is a global online business-to business seafood marketplace with integrated shipping, payment, customs and quality assurance services.

Gfresh was launched in 2014 and connects sellers of live seafood located in Canada, United States, Europe, Australia and New Zealand directly to buyers located in China (Mainland and Hong Kong).

== History ==
Gfresh is an online seafood marketplace, launched in 2014, connects sellers of live seafood directly to buyers in China and Hong Kong.

Gfresh has its financial backing from Shanghai Regal Co. and Gfresh founders. Gfresh's presence can be found in markets like Canadian Dungeness crab and geoduck, American lobster, and Australian abalone where over 4,000 boxes, or approximately 120 metric tons of live lobster were sold in one week. Gfresh sells seafood directly to buyers in over 10 of China’s major cities including Shanghai, Beijing, Guangzhou, and Shenzhen, as well as Hong Kong.

Gfresh has a signed industry-first agreement with the China Certification and Inspection Group Canada (CCIC) at the 2016 BC Seafood Expo.

In 2016, Gfresh also signed a Memorandum of Understanding at the conference with the Global Aquaculture Alliance (GAA) at Global Outlook on Aquaculture Leadership in Guangzhou (GOAL).

The online seafood marketplace, Gfresh, hosted sales of over RMB20 million (about $4.3m) in one week. The largest portion of these sales came from a Chinese demand for lobster.

Seafood suppliers from around the world, including US-based Ready Seafood, Canada-based Fisherman's Market and Australia-based Craig Mostyn Group, all sell their products to China through Gfresh.

Gfresh also has a signed agreement with CCIC Australia to assist Australian seafood exports to China.

In November 2016, Gfresh raised $20 million in Series A funding from Riverhill Fund and Legend Capital.
