= Raycom InfoTech Park =

Raycom Infotech Park
- 融科资讯中心
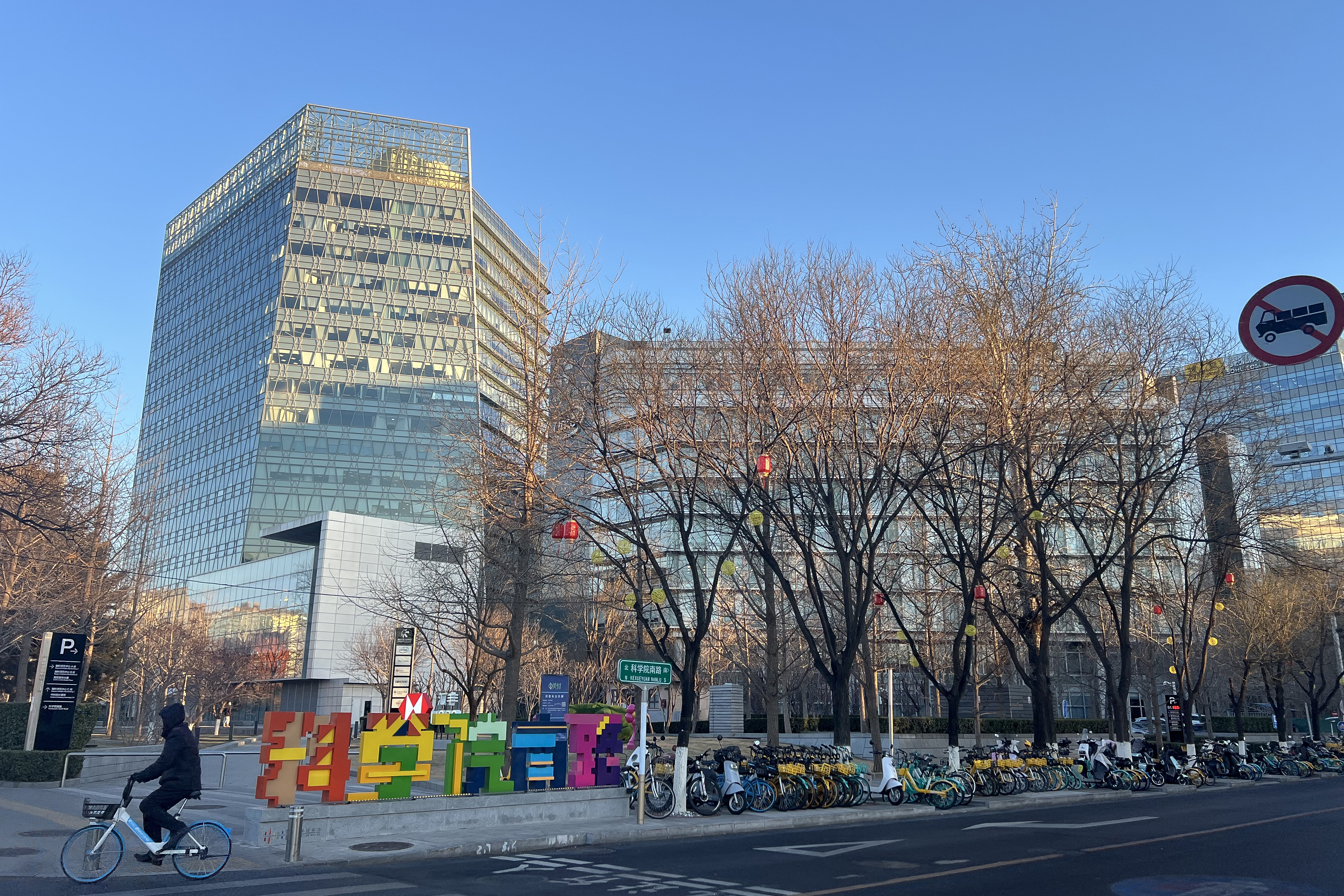
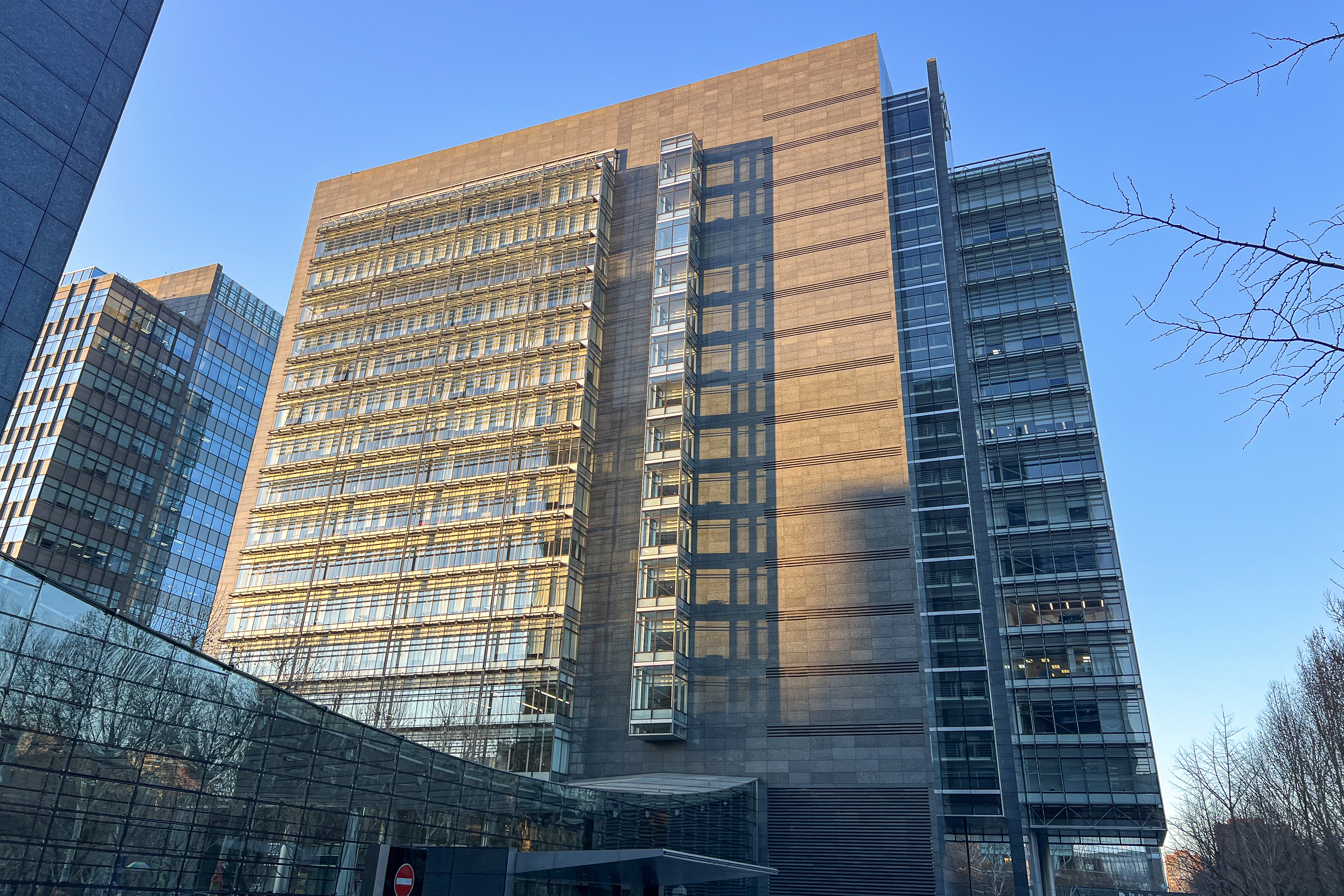
- Building A (left) and Building B (right) Building C (North)
- Interactive map of the Raycom Infotech Park area

General information
- Type: Commercial Building
- Location: No 2, Kexueyuannan Rd, Haidian District, Beijing, China
- Owner: Legend Holdings
- Operator: Raycom property

Design and construction
- Architect: SOM、PCP、SWA、WET、Beijing Institute of Architectural Design Co., Ltd
- Developer: Legend Holdings

Website
- www.raycom-inv.com/Web/index.html

Raycom Infotech Park (Chinese: 融科资讯中心) is a complex office building park in Haidian District, Beijing City, China. It was constructed in the 1990s, and building A was opened in December 2001. Building C was opened in 2004. Building B was opened in 2015. Also, this park has 2 buildings used by Sohu and ICTCAS. This office building area includes many internationally famous companies, such as Intel, Google, DeepSeek, TSMC, Disney (Star), and so on. It is also known as "The Business card of Zhongguancun" (Chinese: 中关村的名片).

== History ==
In 1984, Liu Chuanzhi and his team members founded Legend Holdings and worked in a single-floor room in the same area of Raycom Infotech Park. At present, this room is protected and is not in service. It is a part of Raycom Infotech Park.

In December 2001, building A was launched. This Building is the first office building in the Raycom Infotech park.

In 2004, building C was launched.

In December 2014, Building B was launched. It was awarded LEED awards by the U.S. Green Building Council in 2016.

On August 1, 2016, Google China announced that they entered Building B of Raycom Infotech Park formally.

In May 2024, DeepSeek announced that they entered Building C of Infotech Park formally.

== Resident Enterprise ==
=== Building A ===
- Apple
- Intel
- TSMC
- Synopsys
- NTT DOCOMO
- IOP
- RSC
- NIO
- Prometric
- Industrial Bank
- Bank of China

=== Building B ===
Building B was launched in 2015 designed by Pelli Clarke and Partners (PC&P); its glass wall design was based on an environmentally considerate design. It is also using a standard air control system. It is the latest launched building in the Raycom Infotech Park.

- Heytea (1F)
- Starbucks Coffee (1F)
- Google China (3F-8F)
- Century Games (9F-10F)
- Huawei (10F)
- HSBC (11F)
- CAS Holdings
- Legend Holdings (18F)
- Legend Capital

=== Building C ===
Building C was launched in 2004. It is composed of twin buildings, and it was designed by SOM and BIAD. The hall of the first floor is composed of glass walls and a Steel Structure. This design is created based on some previous examples in mainland China.

- Da Dong Roast Duck Restaurant (1F)
- 迅击信息科技 (2F)
- Deeproute.ai (3F)
- 聚物腾云物联网 (3F)
- DeepSeek (5F)
- Baidu Venture (6F)
- NGC China Ltd.Beijing Branch (Disney Networks Group Asia Pacific) (7F)
- Clarivate Analytics (6F-7F)
- Houghton Mifflin Harcourt (7F)
- AMD
- Vmware
- RedHat
- Hitachi

=== Building D (Sohu.com Media Plaza) ===
Building D is designed by Pelli Clarke & Partners (PC&P) along with BIAD, and the design form is similar to Building C. It is also considerate of environmental elements in the design process. This building is owned by Sohu now.

=== Raycom Plaza ===
It is a commercial space in the basement of Raycom Infotech Park. It has two floors (B1 and B2). It connects with all the office buildings of Raycom Infotech Plaza. Raycom also provides museum space, which is known as "Raycom space". This space hosts many explanations about art, science, and so on.

== See also ==
- Legend Holdings
- Chinese Academy of science
