= Illegal flower tribute =

Chinese Internet meme

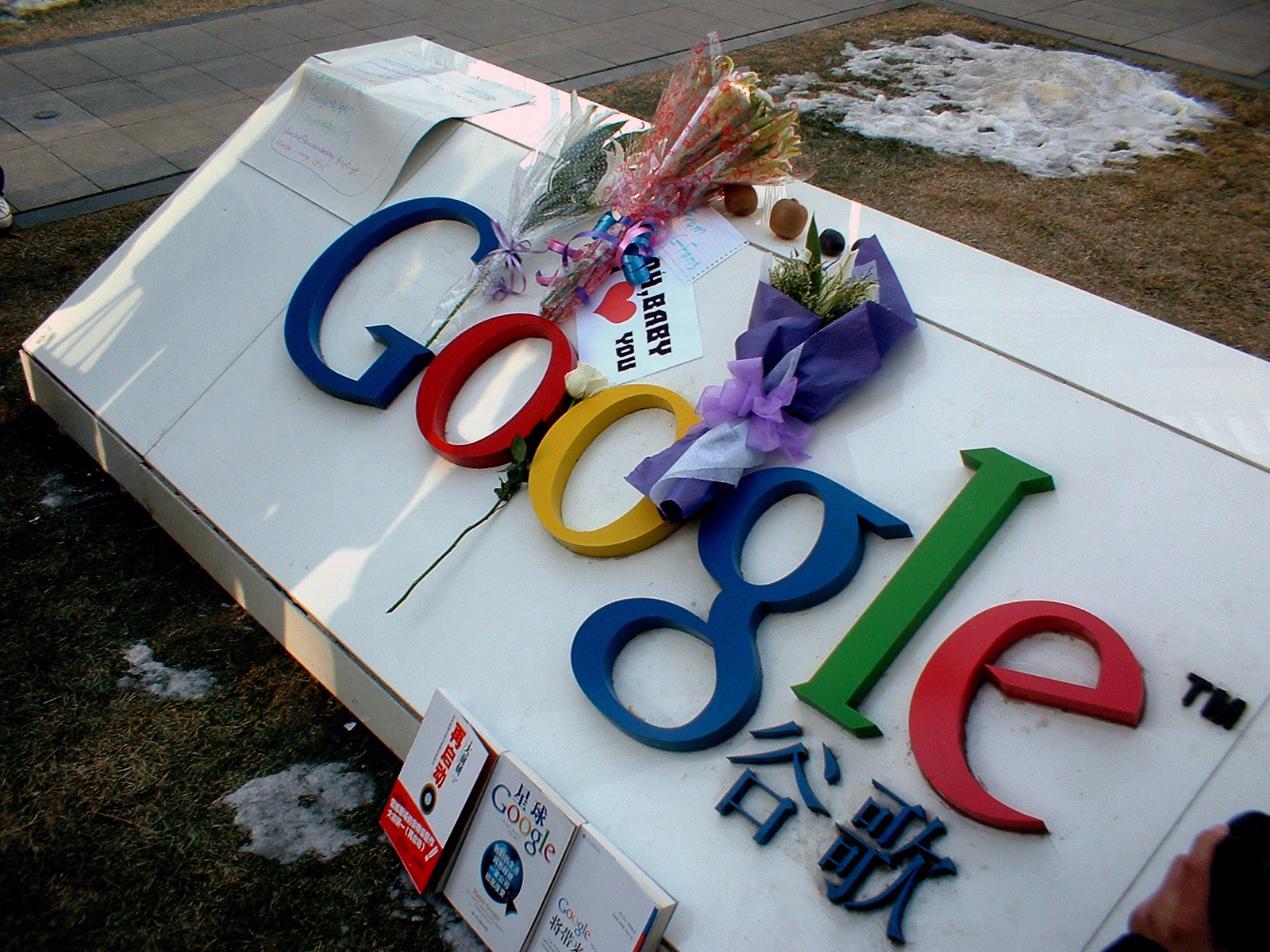
Flowers left outside Google China's headquarters after its announcement it may leave the country

"Illegal flower tribute" (simplified Chinese: 非法献花; traditional Chinese: 非法獻花; pinyin: fēifǎ xiànhuā) is an Internet meme that emerged after Google's announcement of a possible exit from mainland China in January 2010. On 12 January 2010, Google posted an article on its official Blogspot blog, entitled "A New Approach to China", in which it disclosed its decision to end compliance with the Internet censorship in China at Google.cn, citing recent politically motivated hacker attacks from China on Gmail accounts of Chinese human rights activists as its primary concern. Google also announced it had negotiated with the Chinese government on this issue, but no agreement or consensus on a non-censoring search engine was made, so traffic to Google.cn was re-routed to Google.com.hk.

The possibility of Google exiting China prompted well-wishers from the Beijing metropolitan area to show up at Google China's headquarters in Zhongguancun, Beijing to lay flowers and candles in a tribute to Google. However subsequent visitors were arriving only to discover that the flowers donated by previous visitors had been promptly removed by the security guards, one of which reportedly said that, in order to deposit flowers people would need to apply for permits at the related departments; otherwise without approved permits, they would be conducting an "illegal flower tribute".

The phrase "illegal flower tribute" soon became a popular Internet meme in China, owing to its ironic nature. Nevertheless, due to its sensitivity, the phrase was censored on various Chinese websites, including Baidu and Sogou which deleted the article on "illegal flower tribute" at its service Baidu Baike and Sogou Baike.

== See also ==
- Operation Aurora
- Flower power
- List of websites blocked in the People's Republic of China
- Internet censorship in the People's Republic of China
- Censorship in the People's Republic of China
