= Operation Aurora =

Series of cyberattacks conducted by Chinese threat actors

Date	June–December 2009
Location	Not specified – occurred on a worldwide scale.
Result	Diplomatic incident between the United States and China

Belligerents
United States	China

Casualties and losses
Google intellectual property stolen	

Operation Aurora was a series of cyber attacks performed by advanced persistent threats such as the Elderwood Group based in Beijing, China, with associations with the People's Liberation Army. First disclosed publicly by Google (one of the victims) on January 12, 2010, via a blog post, the attacks began in mid-2009 and continued through December 2009.

The attack was directed at dozens of other organizations, of which Adobe Systems, Akamai Technologies, Juniper Networks, and Rackspace have confirmed publicly that they were targeted. According to media reports, Yahoo, Symantec, Northrop Grumman, Morgan Stanley, and Dow Chemical were also among the targets.

As a result of the attack, Google stated in its weblog that it plans to operate a completely uncensored version of its search engine in China "within the law, if at all," and acknowledged that if this is not possible, it may quit China and close its Chinese offices. Official Chinese sources claimed this was part of a strategy developed by the U.S. government.

The attack was named "Operation Aurora" by Dmitri Alperovitch, Vice President of Threat Research at cybersecurity company McAfee. Research by McAfee Labs discovered that "Aurora" was part of the file path on the attacker's machine that was included in two of the malware binaries McAfee said were associated with the attack. "We believe the name was the internal name the attacker(s) gave to this operation", McAfee Chief Technology Officer George Kurtz said in a weblog post.

According to McAfee, the primary goal of the attack was to gain access to and potentially modify source code repositories at these high-technology, security, and defense contractor companies. "[The source code repositories] were wide open," says Alperovitch. "No one ever thought about securing them, yet these were the crown jewels of most of these companies in many ways—much more valuable than any financial or personally identifiable data that they may have and spend so much time and effort protecting."

== History ==
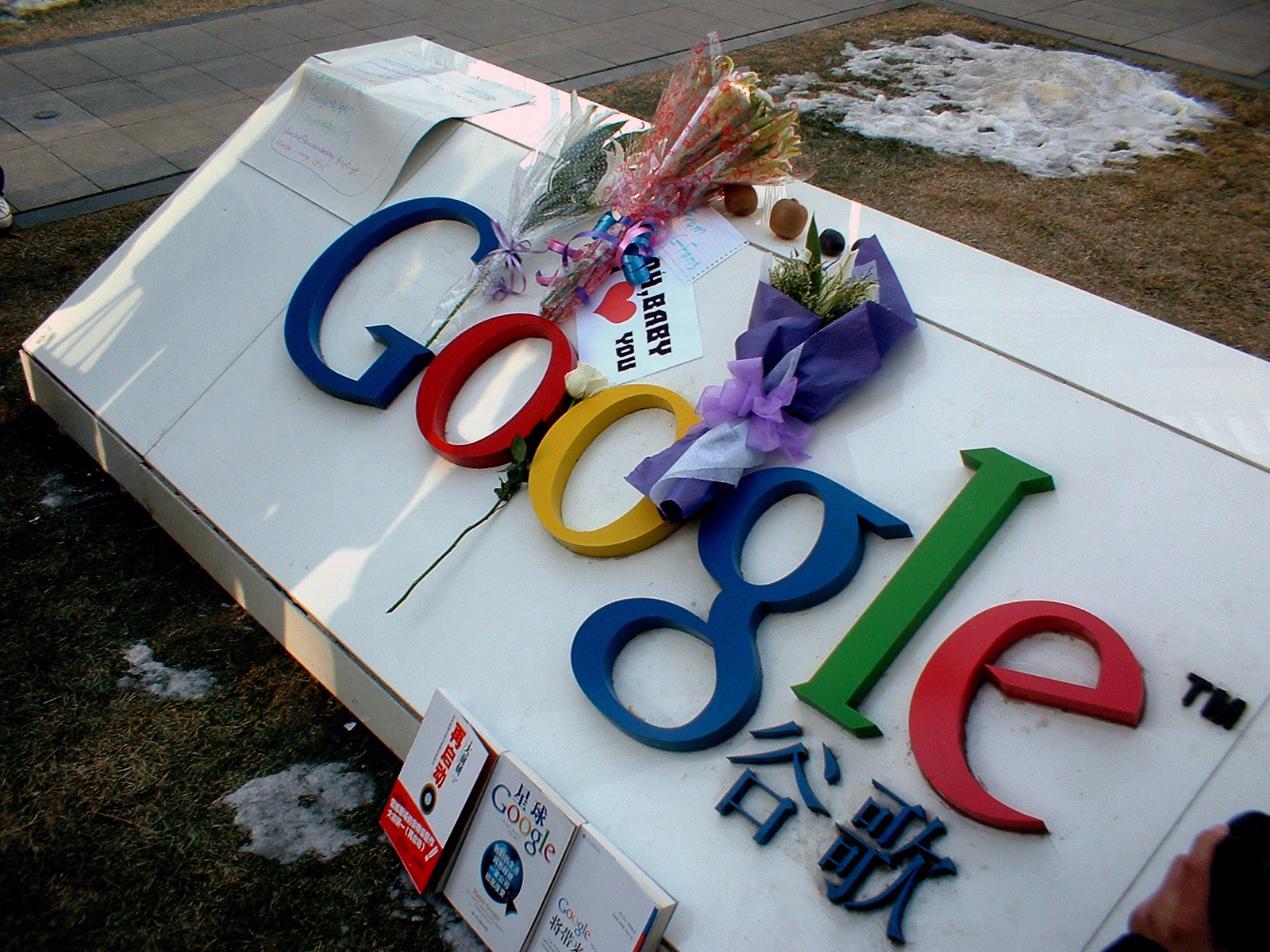
Flowers left outside Google China's headquarters after its announcement it might leave the country

On January 12, 2010, Google revealed on its weblog that it had been the victim of a cyber attack. The company said the attack occurred in mid-December and originated from China. Google stated that more than 20 other companies had been attacked; other sources have since cited that more than 34 organizations were targeted. As a result of the attack, Google said it was reviewing its business in China. On the same day, United States Secretary of State Hillary Clinton issued a brief statement condemning the attacks and requesting a response from China.

On January 13, 2010, the news agency All Headline News reported that the United States Congress plans to investigate Google's allegations that the Chinese government used the company's service to spy on human rights activists.

In Beijing, visitors left flowers outside of Google's office. However, these were later removed, with a Chinese security guard stating that this was an "illegal flower tribute". The Chinese government has yet to issue a formal response, although an anonymous official stated that China was seeking more information on Google's intentions.

== Attackers involved ==
Technical evidence including IP addresses, domain names, malware signatures, and other factors, show Elderwood was behind the Operation Aurora attack. The "Elderwood" group was named by Symantec (after a source-code variable used by the attackers), and is referred to as the "Beijing Group" by Dell Secureworks. The group obtained some of Google's source code, as well as access to information about Chinese activists. Elderwood also targeted numerous other companies in the shipping, aeronautics, arms, energy, manufacturing, engineering, electronics, financial, and software sectors.

The "APT" designation for the Chinese threat actors responsible for attacking Google is APT17.

Elderwood specializes in attacking and infiltrating second-tier defense industry suppliers that make electronic or mechanical components for major defense companies. Those companies then become a cyber "stepping stone" to gain access to the major defense contractors. One attack procedure used by Elderwood is to infect legitimate websites frequented by employees of the target company – a so-called "water hole" attack, just as lions stake out a watering hole for their prey. Elderwood infects these less-secure sites with malware that downloads to a computer that accesses the site. After that, the group searches inside the network to which the infected computer is connected, finding and then downloading executives' e-mails and critical documents on company plans, decisions, acquisitions, and product designs.

== Attack analysis ==
In its weblog in posting, Google stated that some of its intellectual property had been stolen. It suggested that the attackers were interested in accessing Gmail accounts of Chinese dissidents. According to the Financial Times, two accounts used by Ai Weiwei had been attacked, their contents read and copied; his bank accounts were investigated by state security agents who claimed he was being investigated for "unspecified suspected crimes". However, the attackers were only able to view details of two accounts and those details were limited to information such as the subject line and the accounts' creation date.

Security experts immediately noted the sophistication of the attack. Two days after the attack became public, McAfee reported that the attackers had exploited purported zero-day vulnerabilities (unfixed and previously unknown to the target system developers) in Internet Explorer and dubbed the attack "Operation Aurora". A week after the report by McAfee, Microsoft issued a fix for the problem, and admitted that they had known about the security flaw used since September. Additional vulnerabilities were found in Perforce, the source code revision software used by Google to manage their source code.

VeriSign's iDefense Labs claimed that the attacks were perpetrated by "agents of the Chinese state or proxies thereof".

According to a diplomatic cable from the U.S. Embassy in Beijing, a Chinese source reported that the Chinese Politburo directed the intrusion into Google's computer systems. The cable suggested that the attack was part of a coordinated campaign executed by "government operatives, public security experts and Internet outlaws recruited by the Chinese government". The report suggested that it was part of an ongoing campaign in which attackers have "broken into American government computers and those of Western allies, the Dalai Lama and American businesses since 2002". According to The Guardian's reporting on the leak, the attacks were "orchestrated by a senior member of the Politburo who typed his own name into the global version of the search engine and found articles criticising him personally".

Once a victim's system was compromised, a backdoor connection that masqueraded as an SSL connection made connections to command and control servers operating in Illinois, Texas, and Taiwan, including machines that were using stolen Rackspace customer accounts. The victim's machine then began exploring the protected corporate intranet that it was a part of, searching for other vulnerable systems as well as sources of intellectual property, specifically the contents of source code repositories.

The attacks were thought to have definitively ended on Jan 4 when the command and control servers were deactivated, although it is not known at this time whether or not the attackers deactivated them intentionally. However, the attacks were still occurring as of February 2010.

== Response and aftermath ==
The German, Australian, and French governments publicly issued warnings to users of Internet Explorer after the attack, advising them to use alternative browsers at least until a fix for the security breach was made. The German, Australian, and French governments considered all versions of Internet Explorer vulnerable or potentially vulnerable.

In an advisory on January 14, 2010, Microsoft said that attackers targeting Google and other U.S. companies used software that exploits a flaw in Internet Explorer. The vulnerability affects Internet Explorer versions 6, 7, and 8 on Windows 7, Vista, Windows XP, Server 2003, Server 2008 R2, as well as IE 6 Service Pack 1 on Windows 2000 Service Pack 4.

The Internet Explorer exploit code used in the attack has been released into the public domain, and has been incorporated into the Metasploit Framework penetration testing program. A copy of the exploit was uploaded to Wepawet, a service for detecting and analyzing web-based malware operated by the computer security group at the University of California, Santa Barbara. "The public release of the exploit code increases the possibility of widespread attacks using the Internet Explorer vulnerability", said George Kurtz, CTO of McAfee, of the attack. "The now public computer code may help cybercriminals craft attacks that use the vulnerability to compromise Windows systems".

Security company Websense said it identified "limited public use" of the unpatched IE vulnerability in attacks against users who strayed onto malicious Web sites. According to Websense, the attack code it spotted is the same as the exploit that went public last week. "Internet Explorer users currently face a real and present danger due to the public disclosure of the vulnerability and release of attack code, increasing the possibility of widespread attacks," said George Kurtz, chief technology officer of McAfee, in a blog update. Confirming this speculation, Websense Security Labs identified additional sites using the exploit on January 19. According to reports from Ahnlab, the second URL was spread through the Instant Messenger network Misslee Messenger, a popular IM client in South Korea.

Researchers have created attack code that exploits the vulnerability in Internet Explorer 7 (IE7) and IE8—even when Microsoft's recommended defensive measure (Data Execution Prevention (DEP)) is activated. According to Dino Dai Zovi, a security vulnerability researcher, "even the newest IE8 isn't safe from attack if it's running on Windows XP Service Pack 2 (SP2) or earlier, or on Windows Vista RTM (release to manufacturing), the version Microsoft shipped in January 2007."

Microsoft admitted that the security flaw used had been known to them since September. Work on an update was prioritized and on Thursday, January 21, 2010, Microsoft released a security patch intended to counter this weakness, the published exploits based on it and a number of other privately reported vulnerabilities. They did not state if any of the latter had been used or published by exploiters or whether these had any particular relation to the Aurora operation, but the entire cumulative update was termed critical for most versions of Windows, including Windows 7.

Security researchers continued to investigate the attacks. HBGary, a security company, released a report in which they claimed to have found some significant markers that might help identify the code developer. The company also said that the code was Chinese language based but could not be associated specifically with any government entity.

On February 19, 2010, a security expert investigating the cyber-attack on Google, has claimed that the people who performed the attack were also responsible for the cyber-attacks made on several Fortune 100 companies in the past one and a half years. They have also tracked the attack back to its origin, which seems to be two Chinese schools, Shanghai Jiao Tong University and Lanxiang Vocational School. As highlighted by The New York Times, both of these schools have associations with the Chinese search engine Baidu, a rival of Google China. Both Lanxiang Vocational and Jiaotong University have denied the allegation.

In March 2010, Symantec, which was helping investigate the attack for Google, identified Shaoxing as the source of 21.3% of all (12 billion) malicious emails sent throughout the world.

=== Google retrospective ===
On October 3, 2022, Google on YouTube released a six-episode series concerning the events that occurred during Operation Aurora, with commentary from insiders who dealt with the attack, though the series' primary emphasis was to reassure the Google-using public that measures are in place to counter hacking attempts.

== See also ==
- Chinese intelligence activity in other countries
- Chinese Intelligence Operations in the United States
- Cyber-warfare
- Economic and Industrial Espionage
- GhostNet
- Honker Union
- Titan Rain
- Vulcanbot
- MUSCULAR (surveillance program)
