= Google China =

Chinese subsidiary of Google

Coordinates: 39°59′34″N 116°19′24″E

Google Information Technology (China) Co., Ltd.
- Native name: 谷歌信息技术（中国）有限公司
- Website type: Search engine
- Founded: 12 April 2006; 20 years ago
- Headquarters: Raycom InfoTech Park, Beijing, China
- Area served: China
- Parent: Google
- Current status: Limited access; links to Google Hong Kong

Google China
- Chinese: 谷歌
- Literal meaning: The song of the valley. (Also the song of sowing, expectation, harvest, and joy.)
Transcriptions
Standard Mandarin
- Hanyu Pinyin: Gǔgē

Google China is a subsidiary of Google. Once a popular search engine, most services offered by Google China were blocked by the Great Firewall in the People's Republic of China. In 2010, searching via all Google search sites, including Google Mobile, was moved from mainland China to Hong Kong. By November 2013, Google's search market share in China had declined to 1.7% from its August 2009 level of 36.2%, though it has slowly risen since, representing 3.8% of the search engine market by July 2020.

== History ==
=== 2000–2006: Launch of search service ===
On 12 September 2000, Google announced the addition of Simplified and Traditional Chinese versions to Google.com and began to provide search services for Chinese users worldwide.

On 10 September 2004, Google.com launched Simplified Chinese Google News.

In 2005, Google China moved from Xinhua Insurance Building, outside Jianguomen, to Keji Building in the Tsinghua Science Park near the east gate of Tsinghua University, where Google rented two floors. In addition, Google has an office in the Beijing Fortune Center.

On 19 July 2005, Kai-Fu Lee, a former Microsoft executive and the founder in 1998 of Microsoft Research Asia, joined Google and officially became the president of Google China. On the same day, Google announced that it would set up a research and development center in China.

=== 2006–2009: Censorship of Google ===
In January 2006, Simplified Chinese Google News was renamed from "Google 新闻" (Google News) to "Google 资讯" (Google Information).

On 26 January 2006, Google launched its China-based google.cn search page, with results subject to censorship by the Chinese government. Google used its Chinese name, GǔGē ("harvest song"), but it never caught on with Chinese internet users.

On 12 April 2006, Google's Global CEO Eric Schmidt announced Google's Chinese name as "谷歌" (The Chinese character version of GǔGē) in Beijing. Google officially entered the mainland Chinese market.

From September 2006 until August 2016, the office of Google China was a ten-floor building in Kejian Building in the Tsinghua Science Park.

In March 2009, China blocked access to Google's YouTube site due to footage showing Chinese security forces beating Tibetans; access to other Google online services was being denied to users arbitrarily.

On 4 September 2009, after four years leading Google China, Kai-Fu Lee unexpectedly left to start a venture fund, amid debate about the Chinese government's censorship policies and Google's decreasing share to rival Baidu and Sogou.

=== 2010–2016: Giving up search service ===
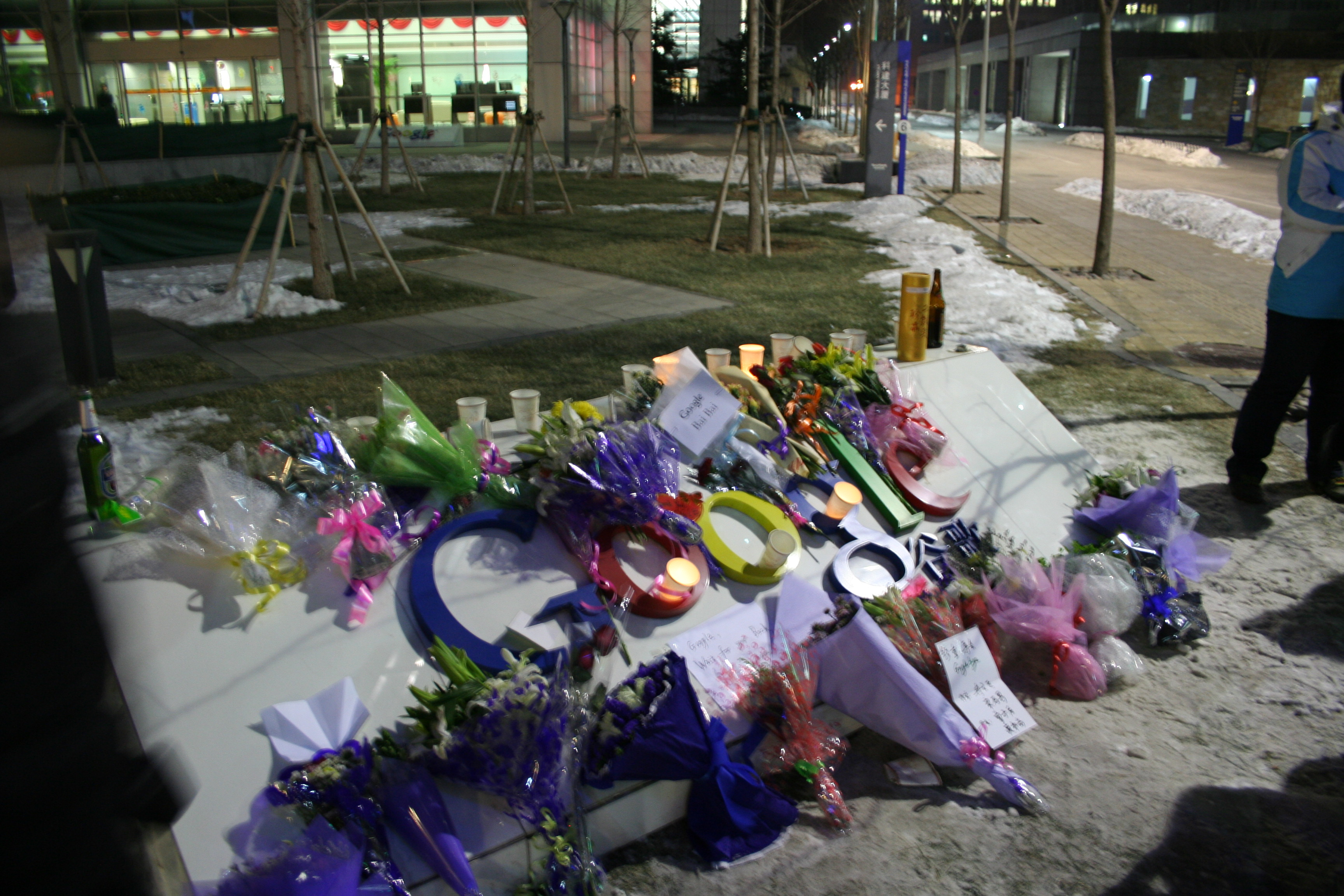
Flowers placed on the Google sign by members of the public in Beijing, China, following the 2010 announcement that the company was leaving the country

In January 2010, Google announced that, in response to a Chinese-originated hacking attack on them and other US tech companies, they were no longer willing to censor searches in China and would pull out of the country completely if necessary. At the same time, Google started to redirect all search queries from Google.cn to Google.com.hk in Hong Kong, which returned results without censorship. At the time, Hong Kong was vested with independent judicial power and was not subject to most Chinese laws, including those requiring the restriction of free flow of information and censorship of Internet traffic. David Drummond, senior vice president of Google, stated in the official Google blog that the circumstances surrounding censorship of the Internet in China led Google to move its search to Hong Kong, the absence of censorship making it more effective for networking and sharing information with Internet users in mainland China.

On 30 March 2010, searching via all Google search sites in all languages was banned in mainland China; any attempt to search using Google resulted in a DNS error. Initial reports suggested that the error was caused by a banned string (RFA, as in "Radio Free Asia") being automatically added to Google search queries upstream of user queries, with prominent China journalists disagreeing over whether the blockage was an intentional and high-level attempt to censor search results. Other Google services such as Google Mail and Google Maps appeared to be unaffected. Xiao Qiang, director of the China Internet Project at UC Berkeley and founder of the China Digital Times, noted that the ban in mainland China could eventually block all access to Google sites and applications if the Chinese government wanted. The ban was lifted the next day.

On 30 June 2010, Google ended the automatic redirect of Google China to Google Hong Kong, and instead placed a link to Google Hong Kong to avoid their Internet Content Provider (ICP) license being revoked.

The fact that Google had ended some of its services in China, and the reasons for it, were censored in China. Spoof sites, such as the Google knockoff Gooje emerged, with creators looking to provide an alternative to Google in China, or as a political message pushing Google to stay in mainland China.

In 2013 Google stopped displaying warning messages that had shown up for mainland Chinese users who were attempting to search for politically sensitive phrases.

Google's Internet mail service, Gmail, and Chrome, Google-based search inquiries, along with most Google services except those provided by google.cn, such as Google Maps and translate (which has already been closed by Google in 2019 and 2022), has been blocked in mainland China since 27 May 2014. The ban was briefly lifted on the evening of 10 July 2014, but was blocked again in the early morning hours of the next day. Google has maintained that it would continue with the research and development offices in China along with the sales offices for other Google products such as Android smartphone software.

=== 2016–present: Attempts to reenter mainland China ===
On 1 August 2016, Google China moved its headquarters from Tsinghua Science Park to Rongke Information Center.

On 8 December 2016, Google held the Google Developer Day China 2016 in the China National Convention Center, and announced the creation of a developer website for mainland Chinese developers, including Google Developers China (developers.google.cn), Android Developers China (developer.android.google.cn), and Firebase China (firebase.google.cn). This was the first time Google China used the ".cn" domain name again after giving up Google China.

On 31 August 2017, Google China announced TensorFlow China (tensorflow.google.cn).

In May 2017, Google China held Future of Go Summit with the Chinese government.

On 13 December 2017, Google China held Google Developer Day China 2017 in Shanghai and announced the establishment of the Google AI China Center, led by Fei-Fei Li and Professor Li Jia.

On 14 August 2020, following the enactment of the Hong Kong national security law, Google China stated that it would no longer directly respond to data requests from the Hong Kong authorities, and would instead have them go through a Mutual Legal Assistance Treaty with the United States.

==== Dragonfly project ====
On 1 August 2018, The Intercept reported that Google plans to launch a censored version of its search engine in China, code-named Dragonfly. The finalized version could have been launched as soon as January 2019, however it did not. On 6 August, China Communist Party's official newspaper People's Daily published a column which was soon deleted saying that they might welcome a return of Google if it plays by Beijing's strict rules for media oversight. Soon afterwards, Li Yanhong, the founder of Baidu, China's dominant search engine, predicted his company will "again be victorious" against Google if the U.S. search giant returns to China.

Despite statements from Google executives that their work had been "exploratory", "in early stages" and that Google was "not close to launching a search product in China", on 21 September 2018 The Intercept reported the existence of an internal memo authored by a Google engineer that revealed details about the project. The memo reportedly said that a prototype of the censored search engine was being developed as an app called Maotai that would record the geographical position and internet history of its users, and accused Google of developing "spying tools" for the Chinese government to monitor its citizens.

In December 2018, The Intercept reported that the Dragonfly project had "effectively been shut down" after a clash within Google, led by members of the company's privacy team.

== Business ==
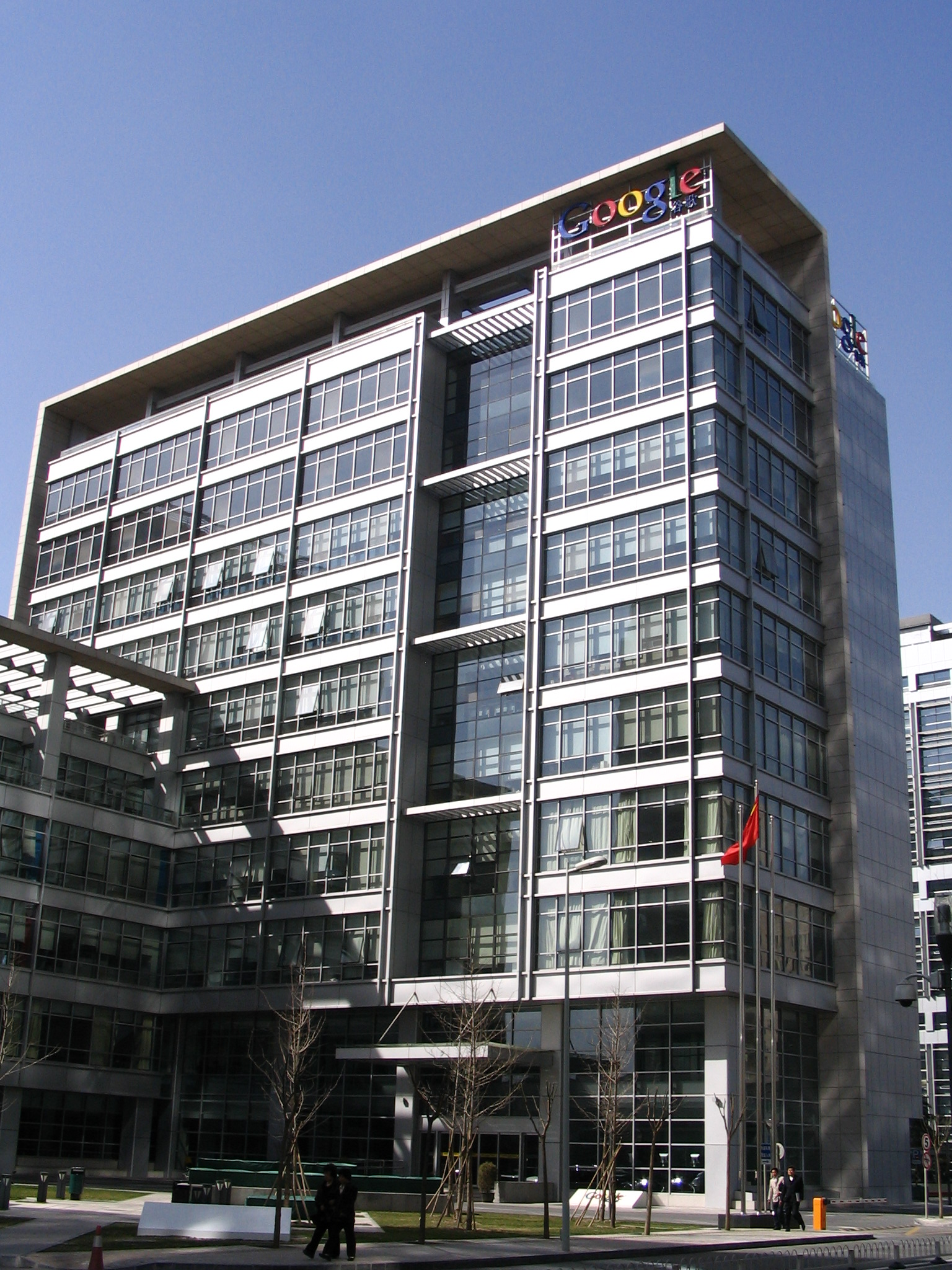
Google China headquarters in Tsinghua University Science Park in Beijing

Google China served a market of mainland Chinese Internet users that was estimated in July 2009 to number 338 million, up from 45.8 million in June 2002. A China Internet Network Information Center (CNNIC) report published a year and a half earlier, on 17 January 2001, had estimated the mainland Chinese Internet user base at 22.5 million, considerably higher than the number published by Iamasia, a private Internet ratings company. The first CNNIC report, published on 10 October 1997, estimated the number of Chinese Internet users at fewer than 650 thousand people.

The competitors of Google China include Bing, Sogou and Baidu, often called the "Google of China" because of its resemblance and similarity to Google. In August 2008, Google China launched a music download service, Google Music Search.

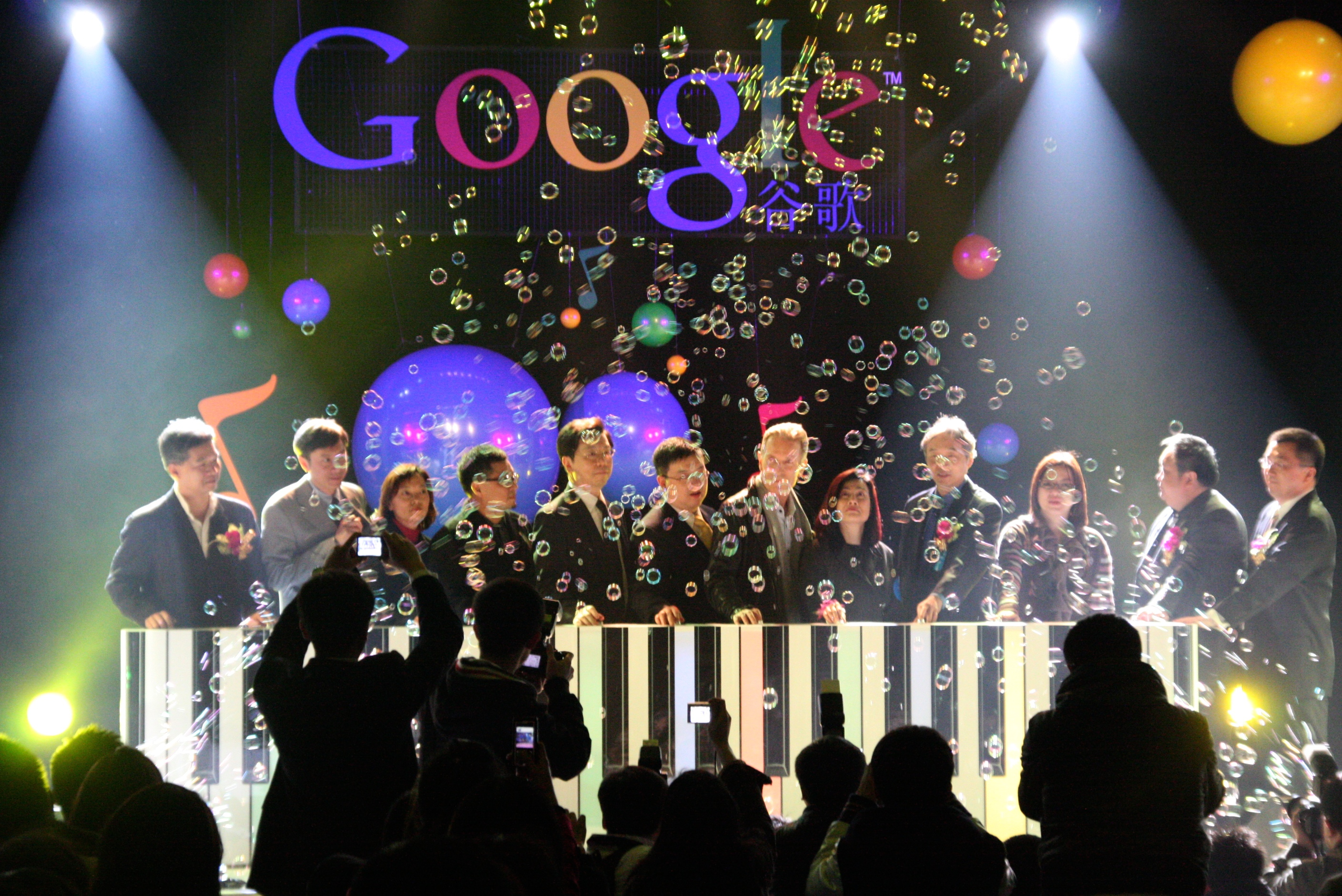
Google China local product—Google MUSIC's conference

In 2010, Google China had a market share in China of 29% according to Analysys International. By October 2012, that number was down to 5%. It further declined to 1.7% in 2013.

Some Google entities in China use the alternative Chinese name Guguo (Chinese: 咕果; pinyin: Gūguǒ).

== Controversies ==
Before Google China's establishment, Google.com itself was accessible, even though much of its content was not accessible because of censorship. According to official statistics, google.com was accessible 90% of the time, and a number of services were not available at all.

Since announcing its intent to comply with Internet censorship laws in China, Google China had been the focus of controversy over what critics view as capitulation to the "Golden Shield Project". Because of its self-imposed censorship, whenever people searched for prohibited Chinese keywords on a blocked list maintained by the PRC government, google.cn displayed at the bottom of the page (translated): In accordance with local laws, regulations and policies, part of the search result is not shown. Some searches, such as (as of June 2009) "Tank Man" were blocked entirely, with only the message, "Search results may not comply with the relevant laws, regulations and policy, and cannot be displayed" appearing.

Google argued that it could play a role more useful to the cause of free speech by participating in China's IT industry than by refusing to comply and being denied admission to the mainland Chinese market. "While removing search results is inconsistent with Google's mission, providing no information (or a heavily degraded user experience that amounts to no information) is more inconsistent with our mission," a statement said.

A US PBS analysis reported clear differences between results returned for controversial keywords by the censored and uncensored search engines. Google set up computer systems inside China that try to access Web sites outside the country. If a site is inaccessible (e.g., because of the Golden Shield Project), then it was added to Google China's blacklist.

In June 2006 Google co-founder Sergey Brin was quoted as saying that virtually all of Google's customers in China were using the non-censored version of their website.

Google critics in the United States claimed that Google China is a flagrant violation of the Google motto, "Don't be evil".

On 9 April 2007, Google China spokesman Cui Jin admitted that the pinyin Google Input Method Editor (IME) "was built leveraging some non-Google database resources". This was in response to a request on 6 April from the Chinese search engine company Sohu that Google stop distributing its pinyin IME software because it allegedly copied portions from Sohu's own software.

In early 2008 Guo Quan, a university professor who had been dismissed after having founded a democratic opposition party, announced plans to sue Yahoo! and Google in the United States for having blocked his name from search results in mainland China.

=== Operation Aurora and 2010 withdrawal ===
On 12 January 2010, Google announced that it was "no longer willing to continue censoring" results on Google.cn, citing a breach of Gmail accounts of Chinese human rights activists including thousands of activists involved with the religious movement Falun Gong and hundreds of overseas activists in fields such as encryption, intellectual property and democracy. The company learned that the hackers had breached two Gmail accounts but were only able to access 'from' and 'to' information and subject headers of emails in these accounts. The company's investigation into the attack showed that at least 34 other companies had been similarly targeted, including Adobe Systems, Symantec, Yahoo, Northrop Grumman and Dow Chemical. Experts claimed the aim of the attacks was to gain information on weapon systems, political dissidents, and valuable source code that powers software applications. Additionally, dozens of Gmail accounts in China, Europe, and the United States had been regularly accessed by third parties, by way of phishing or malware on the users' computers rather than a security breach at Google. Although Google did not explicitly accuse the Chinese government of the breach, it said it was no longer willing to censor results on google.cn, and that it would discuss over the next few weeks "the basis on which we could run an unfiltered search engine within the law, if at all. We recognize that this may well mean having to shut down Google.cn, and potentially our offices in China".

On 13 January 2010, the news agency AHN reported that the U.S. Congress planned to investigate Google's allegations that the Chinese government used the company's service to spy on human rights activists. In a major speech by the US Secretary of State Hillary Clinton, analogies were drawn between the Berlin Wall and the free and unfree Internet. Chinese articles came back saying that the United States uses the internet as a means to create worldwide hegemony based on Western values. The issue of Google's changed policy toward China was cited as a potentially major development in world affairs, marking a split between authoritarian socialism and the Western model of free capitalism and Internet access.

The Chinese government since made numerous standard and general statements on the matter, but took no real action. It also criticized Google for failing to provide any evidence of its accusation. Accusations were made by Baidu, a competing Chinese search engine, that Google was pulling out for financial rather than other reasons. At the time Baidu was the market leader in China with about 60% of the market compared to Google's 31%, Yahoo placing third with less than 10%. The Chinese People's Daily newspaper published an op-ed on Google which criticized western leaders for politicizing the way in which China controls citizens' access to the Internet, saying "implementing monitoring according to a country's national context is what any government has to do", and that China's need to censor the internet is greater than that of developed countries, "The Chinese society has generally less information bearing capacity than developed countries such as the U.S. ..."

While Jiang Yu, a spokesperson of China's Foreign Ministry, promoted the Chinese government's "development of the internet", Wang Chen of China's State Council Information Office defended online censorship: "Maintaining the safe operation of the Internet and the secure flow of information is a fundamental requirement for guaranteeing state security and people's fundamental interests, promoting economic development and cultural prosperity and maintaining a harmonious and stable society."

According to Joseph Cheng, a professor of political science from City University of Hong Kong, the ruling Chinese Communist Party was deploying Chinese nationalism to stifle debate about censorship in 2010. By criticizing cultural export (in this case, the localization of Google in China), it provided defense to justify the Chinese authorities' censorship control. The Chinese authorities were accused of steering state-run media to bundle Google together with other disputes with United States that had been stirring nationalist rancour in China at the time. On the state-run tabloid Global Times such examples are found, one user wrote "Get the hell out" while another one wrote "Ha ha, I'm going to buy firecrackers to celebrate!"

Isaac Mao, a prominent Chinese internet expert, speculated that 90% of Internet users in China did not care whether Google was leaving or not. Among Chinese users who strongly supported Google remaining in China without censorship (or leaving China to keep its neutrality and independence), many were accustomed to using circumvention technology to access blocked websites.

Despite being blocked in China, the simplified Chinese version of Google services are still present, as per the case of most Western websites being blocked in China.

== Censorship ==
=== Subsequent events ===
Since 27 May 2014, Google's various services have been suspected of having been subject to malicious interference from the Great Firewall of China, as a result of which users became unable to access them. Since then, users from mainland China found that Google's various sub-sites and other services (Google Play, Gmail, Google Docs, etc.) could not be accessed or used normally, including sign-ins to Google Accounts. Although some services provided by Google China's domain site (google.cn) like Google Maps and Google Translate remained functional, users from certain places still were unable to visit them. On the evening of 10 July 2014, users became able to use Google's services and functions, but users reported that access was denied in the early morning hours of the next day.

=== Blockage of Google ===
In November 2012, GreatFire.Org reported that China had blocked access to Google. The group reported that all Google domains, including Google search, Gmail, and Google Maps, became inaccessible. The reason for the blockage was likely to control the content in the nation's Internet while the government prepared to change leadership.

As the 20th anniversary of the Tiananmen Square massacre approached, Chinese authorities blocked more websites and search engines. GreatFire said that the block was far-reaching, and that Google simply wasn't working. "The block is indiscriminate as all Google services in all countries, encrypted or not, are now blocked in China. This blockage includes Google search, images, Gmail and almost all other products. In addition, the block covers Google Hong Kong, google.com, and all other country specific versions, e.g., Google Japan. It is the tightest censorship ever deployed." The company began to redirect search results from mainland China to its Hong Kong website, which led the Chinese authorities to block the Hong Kong site by making users wait 90 seconds for banned results.

In 2009, one-third of all searches in China were on Google. As of 2013, the US company had only 1.7% market share.

=== Keyword censorship ===
In 2012, Google added a new software feature to warn users when they type in a word censored or blocked in China, beginning to offer suggestions about possible sensitive or banned keywords in China. For example, searching the Chinese character 江; jiāng — which means "river", but is also a common surname — was blocked after erroneous rumours about the death of Jiang Zemin, former General Secretary of the Chinese Communist Party.

In 2017, a glitch allowed access to Google which was soon blocked again.

== See also ==
- 2014 China censorship of Google services
- Censorship by Google
- Chinese Intelligence Operations in the United States
  - Operation Aurora
- Dragonfly (search engine)
- Google bomb
- Illegal flower tribute
- Internet censorship in China
