= Lin Bin =

Chinese businessman

- Born: 25 March 1961 (age 65)
- Citizenship: United States
- Education: Sun Yat-sen University (BE); Drexel University (MS)
- Occupation: Entrepreneur

Lin Bin (born 25 March 1961) is a Chinese-American billionaire entrepreneur, co-founder and vice chairman of Xiaomi.

== Education ==
Lin graduated from Sun Yat-sen University with a Bachelor of Engineering in electrical engineering (radio electronics). He then earned a Master of Science in computer engineering from Drexel University.

== Career ==
After graduation, Lin started at Microsoft, where he worked on Internet Explorer. From 2006 to 2010, he worked as an engineering director at Google and served as vice president of Google China’s Engineering Research Institute. In 2010, Lin co-founded Xiaomi together with Lei Jun and five other individuals, serving as president of the company. After previously stepping down from his role, in 2019 he became the vice chairman of the company.

=== Investments ===
In March 2026, Lin purchased a 1% ownership stake in the Miami Dolphins franchise, valuing the company at $12.5 billion, a record for a minority transaction in sports. The franchise also includes Hard Rock Stadium, the Miami Open, and the Formula 1 Crypto.com Miami Grand Prix.

== Recognition ==
Lin was included on the 2026 Forbes Billionaires List, with an estimated wealth of $10.3 billion, and occupied the 281st position worldwide.
