= Shandong Lanxiang Vocational School =

Coordinates: 36.702°N 116.992°E

Shandong Lanxiang Vocational School 山东蓝翔技师学院

Location
- 11 Lanxiang Middle Road, Tianqiao District, Jinan, Shandong; China

Information
- School type: Private Vocational School
- Established: 1984

The Shandong Lanxiang Vocational School (simplified Chinese: 山东蓝翔高级技工学校; traditional Chinese: 山東藍翔高級技工學校; pinyin: Shāndōng Lánxiáng Gāojí Jìgōng Xuéxiào), colloquially Lanxiang (Chinese: 蓝翔), is a vocational school in the Tianqiao District of Jinan, Shandong, China.

The school was founded in 1984 and is said to have been established with support from the People's Liberation Army. The school admits about 20,000 students per year and offers courses in subjects like cooking, auto repair, construction equipment operations (specialized in excavator), hairdressing, as well as computer skills.

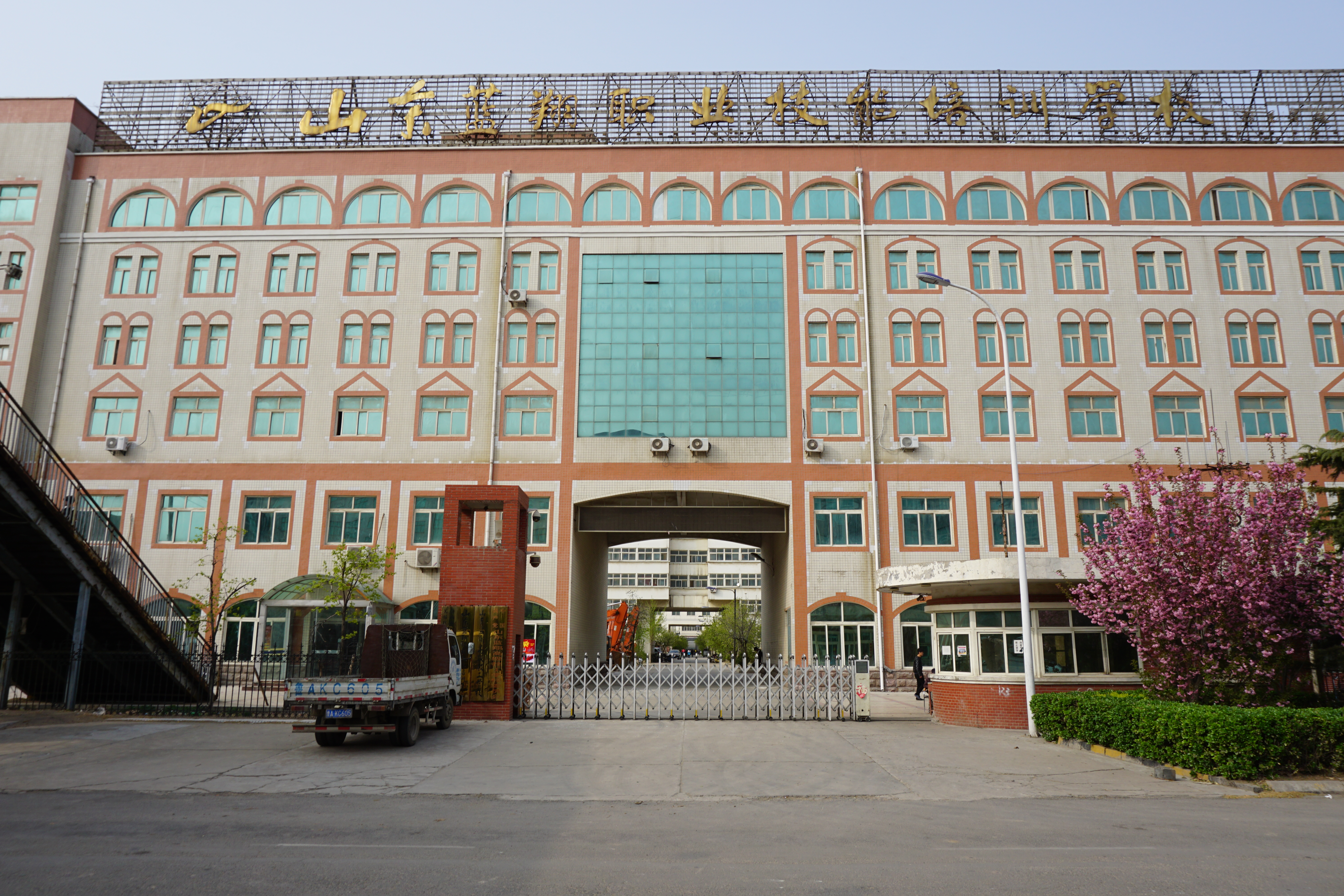
North Campus

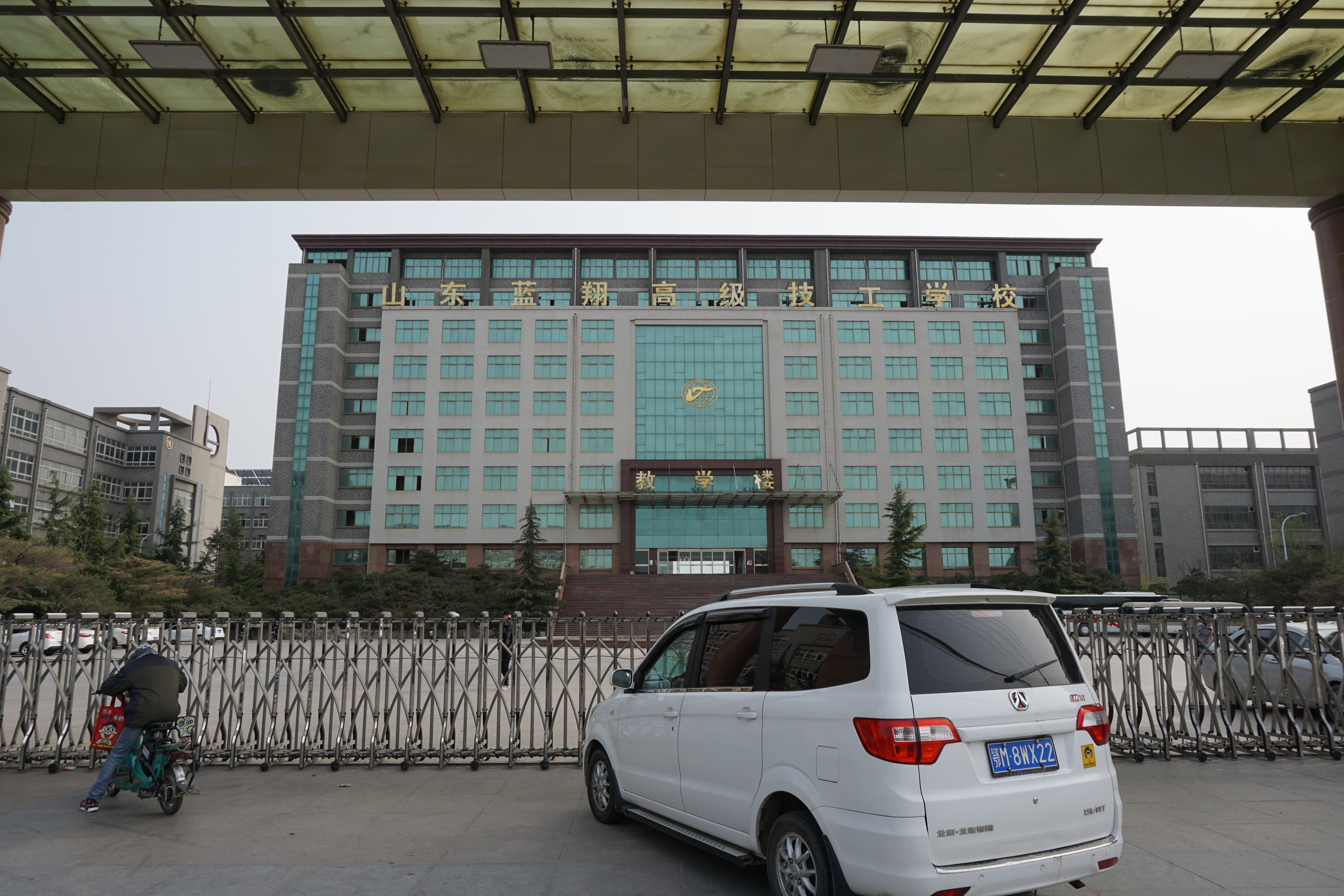
South Campus

== Cyber attacks ==
The school has been suspected as a site from which cyber attacks were launched in 2009 (Operation Aurora) and in 2011; school officials denied that their school launched the attacks.

The school also hosts the command and control server for malware embedded in handled scanners built by a company physically located near the school.

According to the website Week in China, this school is known for its computer training programmes offered to Chinese students and is infamous abroad as a breeding ground for an army of hackers originating from China. The fact that the school was owned by the People's Liberation Army until 2000 further fuelled speculation. However, Zhihu Daily, a Chinese internet newspaper, reported that one its undercover journalists discovered that most of the students at this school were unmotivated farmers who would not be remotely capable of hacking US targets. It remains an open question whether this is an exercise in disinformation.

== Address ==
The street address of the school is 11 Mid Lanxiang Road (Chinese: 蓝翔中路11号).
