= Kaldi (software) =

Open-source speech recognition software toolkit

- Developers: Daniel Povey and others
- Stable release: 5.5.636 / February 2020; 6 years ago
- Written in: C++
- Operating system: Unix systems (Linux, BSD, OSX 10.{8,9} etc.), Windows (via Cygwin)
- Type: Speech recognition
- License: Apache License v.2.0
- Website: kaldi-asr.org
- Repository: https://github.com/kaldi-asr/kaldi

Kaldi is an open-source speech recognition toolkit written in C++ for speech recognition and signal processing, freely available under the Apache License v2.0.

Kaldi aims to provide software that is flexible and extensible, and is intended for use by automatic speech recognition (ASR) researchers for building a recognition system.

It supports linear transforms, MMI, boosted MMI and MCE discriminative training, feature-space discriminative training, and deep neural networks.

Kaldi is capable of generating features like mfcc, fbank, fMLLR, etc. Hence in recent deep neural network research, a popular usage of Kaldi is to pre-process raw waveform into acoustic feature for end-to-end neural models.

Kaldi has been incorporated as part of the CHiME Speech Separation and Recognition Challenge over several successive events. The software was initially developed as part of a 2009 workshop at Johns Hopkins University.

Kaldi is named after the legendary Ethiopian goat herder Kaldi who was said to have discovered the coffee plant.

== See also ==
- fMLLR
- List of speech recognition software
