= Timeline of speech and voice recognition =

This is a timeline of speech and voice recognition, a technology which enables the recognition and translation of spoken language into text.

== Overview ==
Time period	Key developments
1952–1971	Speech recognition is at an early stage of development. Specialized devices can recognize few words and accuracy is not very high.
1971–1987	Speech recognition rapidly improves, although the technology is still not commercially available.
1987–2014	Speech recognition continues to improve, becomes widely available commercially, and can be found in many products.

== Full timeline ==
Year	Month and date (if applicable)	Event type	Details
1877		Invention	Thomas Edison's phonograph becomes the first device to record and reproduce sound. The method is fragile, however, and is prone to damage.
1879		Invention	Thomas Edison invents the first dictation machine, a slightly improved version of his phonograph.
1936		Invention	A team of engineers at Bell Labs, led by Homer Dudley, begins work on the Voder, the first electronic speech synthesizer.
1939	March 21	Invention	Dudley is granted a patent for the Voder, US patent 2151091 A.
1939		Demonstration	The Voder is demonstrated at the 1939 Golden Gate International Exposition in San Francisco.
1939–1940		Demonstration	The Voder is demonstrated at the 1939-1940 World's Fair in New York City.
1952		Invention	A team at Bell Labs designs the Audrey, a machine capable of understanding spoken digits.
1962		Demonstration	IBM demonstrates the Shoebox, a machine that can understand up to 16 spoken words in English, at the 1962 Seattle World's Fair.
1971		Invention	IBM invents the Automatic Call Identification system, enabling engineers to talk to and receive spoken answers from a device.
1971–1976		Program	DARPA funds five years of speech recognition research with the goal of ending up with a machine capable of understanding a minimum of 1,000 words. The program led to the creation of the Harpy by Carnegie Mellon, a machine capable of understanding 1,011 words.
Early 1980s		Technique	The hidden Markov model begins to be used in speech recognition systems, allowing machines to more accurately recognize speech by predicting the probability of unknown sounds being words.
Early 1980s		Technique	Nth Order Markov models developed at ITT and used in speech recognition, a more efficient computational model for sequential pattern matching.
Mid 1980s		Invention	IBM begins work on the Tangora, a machine that would be able to recognize 20,000 spoken words by the mid-1980s.
1987		Invention	The invention of the World of Wonder's Julie Doll, a toy children could train to respond to their voice, brings speech recognition technology to the home.
1990		Invention	Dragon launches Dragon Dictate, the first speech recognition product for consumers.
1993		Invention	Speakable items, the first built-in speech recognition and voice enabled control software for Apple computers.
1993		Invention	Sphinx-II, the first large-vocabulary continuous speech recognition system, is invented by Xuedong Huang.
1996		Invention	IBM launches the MedSpeak, the first commercial product capable of recognizing continuous speech.
2002		Application	Microsoft integrates speech recognition into their Office products.
2006		Application	The National Security Agency begins using speech recognition to isolate keywords when analyzing recorded conversations.
2007	January 30	Application	Microsoft releases Windows Vista, the first version of Windows to incorporate speech recognition.
2007		Invention	Google introduces GOOG-411, a telephone-based directory service. This will serve as a foundation for the company's future Voice Search product.
2008	November 14	Application	Google launches the Voice Search app for the iPhone, bringing speech recognition technology to mobile devices.
2011	October 4	Invention	Apple announces Siri, a digital personal assistant. In addition to being able to recognize speech, Siri is able to understand the meaning of what it is told and take appropriate action.
2014	April 2	Application	Microsoft announces Cortana, a digital personal assistant similar to Siri.
2014	November 6	Invention	Amazon announces the Echo, a voice-controlled speaker. The Echo is powered by Alexa, a digital personal assistant similar to Siri and Cortana. While Siri and Cortana are not the most important features of the devices on which they run, the Echo is dedicated to Alexa.

== See also ==
- Speech recognition
- Gender bias in voice technology
- List of speech recognition software
