= ALR =

ALR may refer to:

== Places ==
- Agricultural Land Reserve, Canada
- Alexandra Aerodrome, New Zealand
- Alresford railway station (Essex), England

== Science ==
- Augmenter of Liver Regeneration or GFER, a growth factor
- Aldo-keto reductase family 1, member A1, enzyme

== Law ==
- Allgemeines Landrecht, Prussian Civil Code
- American Law Reports

== Others ==
- American Laundromat Records, a label
- American Literary Review, by the University of North Texas
- Art Loss Register, UK, database for stolen art
- Ashover Light Railway, Derbyshire, England
- Advanced Logic Research, a defunct computer company
- Australian Literary Review
- Automated Lip Reading
- All lane running, on UK's smart motorways
