= Women in American radio =

Women have participated in radio broadcasting in America as presenters and owners.

== Background ==
Radio first gained popularity in the United States in the 1920s along with the new film industry. Although radio faced competition with television from the 1950s, radio has been adjusting to its new role in the 21st century with the Internet and Internet radio.

== Some women in radio ==
=== Early radio ===
The first woman to have her own radio show was Kate Smith, in 1931. From 1937 to 1945 she presented the popular show, "The Kate Smith Hour." Smith went on to host the number one daytime show, "Kate Smith Speaks", a news and commentary program. She was also well known in the 1930s and 1940s for singing "God Bless America" on air. Her final radio show was in 1958.

Pegeen Fitzgerald was another of the first women in the radio industry. Fitzgerald began her own show from her apartment in 1937 and became known as "First Lady of Radio Chatter". In her talk show she covered numerous topics, and in the 1940s her husband and she were one of the most highly paid double acts in radio, earning about $160,000 a year.

As regards ownership, Dorothy Brunson was the first African-American woman to own a radio station. She had bought WEBB located in Baltimore, Maryland in 1979, later adding stations in Atlanta and Wilmington, North Carolina.

=== Current radio ===
Radio has regained a degree of popularity in America. Hosts include Dr. Laura Schlessinger, whose radio program featured her personal advice in response to callers' requests. She began her career on radio in 1975 on a show called KABC (AM) and from 1994 she hosted her own show on KFI.

News hosts include Ellen K from the Southern California radio station 102.7 KIIS-FM. Ellen K has figured in Southern California radio for upwards of 25 years. Her morning show, "The Ellen K Morning Show", on 103.5 KOST, began on October 19, 2015.

Biggest notable female Market jump was SUMMER - Summer James [Still]from Myrtle Beach, South Carolina’s Alternative Rock station WKZQ as APD/MD 7-Midnight to full time on STAR 987 KYSR 7-Midnight in Los Angeles. Summer came on board to a host of changes in radio in the LA Market. From STAR 987 to ALT 987 then leaving IHeartMedia for CBS Afternoon Drive in San Diego. (Summer is also an author of children’s books under the moniker Dr.Mrs.Summer)

== See also ==
- Gender bias in voice technology
