= MFCC =

MFCC can refer to:

- Mel-frequency cepstrum coefficients, mathematical coefficients for sound modeling
- Marriage, family and child counselor, a credential in the field of professional counseling
- Malta Fairs & Conventions Centre, a multi-purpose venue in Ta' Qali, Malta
