= Automated Lip Reading =

Automated Lip Reading (ALR) is a software technology developed by speech recognition expert Frank Hubner. A video image of a person talking can be analysed by the software. The shapes made by the lips can be examined and then turned into sounds. The sounds are compared to a dictionary to create matches to the words being spoken.

The technology was used successfully to analyse silent home movie footage of Adolf Hitler taken by Eva Braun at their Bavarian retreat Berghof.

The video, with words, was included in a documentary titled "Hitler's Private World", Revealed Studios, 2006

Source: New Technology catches Hitler off guard

== See also ==
- Articulatory speech recognition
- Audio-visual speech recognition
- Computational linguistics
- Facial motion capture
- Lip reading
- Silent speech interface
