= Daniel Povey =

British speech recognition researcher

- Education: Cambridge University
- Known for: Speech recognition
- Scientific career
- Fields: Artificial intelligence; Computer engineering
- Institutions: Johns Hopkins University; Xiaomi
- Thesis: Discriminative training for large vocabulary speech recognition (2003)
- Website: danielpovey.com

Daniel Povey is a British researcher in the fields of speech recognition and artificial intelligence. After graduating from Cambridge University, he held research positions at Microsoft and IBM from 2003 to 2012. He worked at Johns Hopkins University as a nontenured associate research professor in the Whiting School of Engineering prior to being fired in August 2019. Later in August 2019, after being fired by Johns Hopkins, Povey was slated to begin working for Facebook, but he rejected Facebook's conditions of employment just days before he would have begun working for them. He was appointed the chief speech scientist at Xiaomi in November 2019, and continued to hold this position as of October 2020. He is also the primary architect and maintainer of Kaldi.

== Johns Hopkins protest ==
By 8 May 2019, protestors at Johns Hopkins University had reached day 35 of a sit-in protest of campus militarization and local police agencies in Garland Hall, restricting access to all faculty and students. Garland Hall, Johns Hopkins University's main administrative hall, was the home location of servers Povey was expected to maintain. According to the university, Povey was denied permission into the building several times prior to 8 May. Led by Povey, counter-protestors entered the building and Povey began removing chains from the doors with a set of bolt cutters. During the chain-removal process, cell-phone footage from the sit-in protestors features a melee between Povey and protestors, as they eventually carry Povey out of the building. Although Povey was adamant that he was the one being attacked in the videos, the university stated that a multitude of Povey's actions, such as leading a group of counter-protestors around campus at 12 am with a set of bolt cutters, threatened the safety of the students and university. Povey would be suspended and ultimately terminated from the university by August 2019.

== Recognition ==
- Fellow, IEEE (inducted 2023)
