= Articulatory speech recognition =

Articulatory speech recognition means the recovery of speech (in forms of phonemes, syllables or words) from acoustic signals with the help of articulatory modeling or an extra input of articulatory movement data. Speech recognition (or automatic speech recognition, acoustic speech recognition) means the recovery of speech from acoustics (sound wave) only. Articulatory information is extremely helpful when the acoustic input is in low quality, perhaps because of noise or missing data.

Measurable information from the articulatory system (e.g. tongue, jaw movements) can supplement acoustic signals to improve phone recognition accuracy by 2%. However, attempts to estimate articulatory data from acoustic signals alone have not significantly enhanced recognition performance.

== See also ==
- Speech recognition
- Articulatory synthesis
- Automated lip reading
- Computational linguistics
