= Fluency Voice Technology =

Speech recognition software company

- Type: Privately held
- Industry: Enterprise Speech Technology, Call Center automation
- Founded: 1998
- Headquarters: London and Philadelphia, UK and US
- Key people: Philip Padfield, CEO
- Products: On Premises Speech Applications, Hosted Speech Solutions
- Website: www.fluencyvoice.com

Fluency Voice Technology was a company that developed and sold packaged speech recognition solutions for use in call centers. Fluency's Speech Recognition solutions are used by call centers worldwide to improve customer service and significantly reduce costs and are available on-premises and hosted.

== History ==
1998 – Fluency was created as a spin-off from the Voice Research & Development team of a company called netdecisions. This R&D operation was established in Cambridge UK. The focus of the development was speech recognition systems based on the VXML standard.
2001 – Fluency became a separate entity in May 2001. Fluency began the creation of a software development platform specifically aimed at automating call center activities. This platform became Fluency's VoiceRunner.
2002 to 2004 – Fluency establishes accomplishes many successful deployments in customer sites such as National Express and Barclaycard.
2003 – Fluency expanded into the USA. Fluency also acquires Vocalis of Cambridge, UK in August 2003.
2004 – Fluency receives £6 million investment from leading European Venture Capitalists and establishes a global OEM partnership with Avaya, and the acquisition of SRC Telecom.
2008 – Fluency is acquired by Syntellect Ltd

== Customers ==
Call Centers around the world use Fluency to improve service and reduce costs. They include Travelodge, Standard Life Bank, Sutton and East Surrey Water, Pizza Hut, CWT, Barclays, Powergen, First Choice, OutRight, J D Williams, Capital Blue Cross, Chelsea Building Society, EDF, bss, TV Licensing and Capita Software Services.
