= Nando de Freitas =

Zimbabwean computer scientist

- Born: Zimbabwe
- Education: University of the Witwatersrand, Trinity College, Cambridge
- Known for: Machine learning; LipNet
- Scientific career
- Fields: Computer science
- Workplaces: University of British Columbia; Oxford University; Google DeepMind; Microsoft AI
- Thesis: Bayesian Methods for Neural Networks (2000)
- Doctoral advisor: Andrew Howard Gee; Mahesan Niranjan; Christophe Andrieu; Arnaud Doucet

Nando de Freitas is a researcher in the field of machine learning, and in particular in the subfields of neural networks, Bayesian inference and Bayesian optimization, and deep learning.

== Biography ==
De Freitas was born in Zimbabwe. He did his undergraduate studies (1991–94) and MSc (1994–96) at the University of the Witwatersrand, and his PhD at Trinity College, Cambridge (1996-2000). From 2001, he was a professor at the University of British Columbia, before joining the Department of Computer Science at the University of Oxford from 2013 to 2017. In 2014, he joined Google's DeepMind when the company acquired Oxford spinoff Dark Blue Labs. He was in charge of the team that worked on creating tools for generating audio and images at DeepMind. In September 2024, de Freitas joined Microsoft AI as VP of AI.

== Awards and recognition ==
De Freitas has been recognised for his contributions to machine learning through the following awards:

- Best Paper Award at the International Conference on Machine Learning (2016)
- Best Paper Award at the International Conference on Learning Representations (2016)
- Google Faculty Research Award (2014)
- Distinguished Paper Award at the International Joint Conference on Artificial Intelligence (2013)
- Charles A. McDowell Award for Excellence in Research (2012)
- Mathematics of Information Technology and Complex Systems Young Researcher Award (2010)
