= LipNet =

Deep learning model for audio-visual speech recognition

LipNet is a deep neural network for audio-visual speech recognition (ASVR). It was created by University of Oxford researchers Yannis Assael, Brendan Shillingford, Shimon Whiteson, and Nando de Freitas. The researchers stated that could match mouth movements to text with 93 percent accuracy, though it was criticized for its test using a limited dataset of words and grammar. It was used in Nvidia's autonomous "backseat driver" prototype Co-Pilot.
