= Saniye Gülser Corat =

Turkish academic

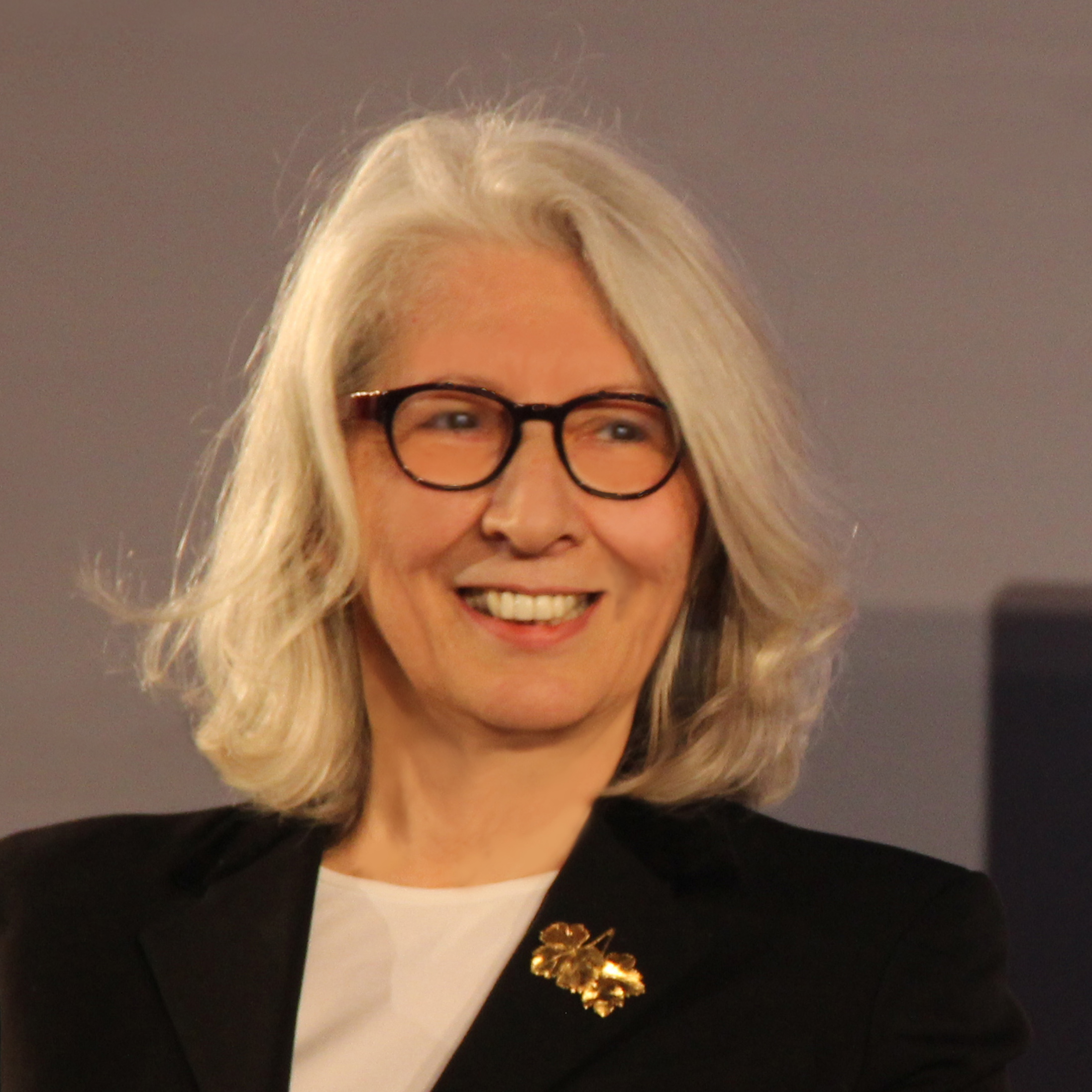
Gülser Corat in November 2019

Saniye Gülser Corat is the Founder and GEO of NoBiasAI?, a global think launched in 2022 with dual objectives: to reflect on a possible paradigm shift in AI from data-driven machine learning (ML) to knowledge-based machine reasoning (MR) and to develop gender audit tools to address gender bias in ML algorithms and datasets.

She served as Director for Gender Equality at UNESCO from September 2004 to August 202August 2020

Prior to joining UNESCO, Gülser was the CEO of a global development consulting company (ECI Consulting, Inc.) based in Ottawa, Canada. In that capacity, she led development projects in over 60 countries. In parallel, she taught graduate seminars at Carleton University and the University of Ottawa.

== Biography ==
Gülser Corat attended Robert College and Bogazici University in Istanbul, Turkey. She also completed a graduate degree in European studies at the College of Europe in Bruges, Belgium, and a graduate degree in international political economy at the Norman Patterson School of International Affairs at Carleton University in Ottawa, Canada. She has a post-graduate degree from Harvard University's John F. Kennedy School of Government, USA.

In September 2004 she joined UNESCO as director for gender equality. During her tenure, she negotiated and secured a unanimous vote by 195 member states to designate gender equality a global priority for the organization in 2007. She launched special campaigns and programmes for girls’ education in STEM, digital skills, safety of women journalists, women in science and women in sport.

She led the landmark 2019 study “I’d Blush if I Could: Closing Gender Divides in Digital Skills in Education”, which found widespread inadvertent gender bias in the most popular artificial intelligence tools for consumers and business.

She initiated and managed research, shedding light on emerging issues such as gender bias in voice assistants powered by AI that culminated in the publication of the report I’d Blush if I Could in March 2019. This report sparked a global conversation with the technology sector culminating in a keynote address at the largest global meeting of the technology sector, the Web Summit, in 2019 and interviews with more than 600 media outlets around the globe - including the BBC, CNN, CBS, ABC, NYT, The Guardian, Forbes, Time

Gülser Corat published UNESCO’s follow-up research in August 2020, “Artificial Intelligence and Gender Equality” which presented findings of a dialogue with experts from the private sector and set forth proposed elements for a framework on gender equality and AI. The Digital Future Society named her one of the top ten women leaders in technology for 2020. In December 2020, she was named the Global Leader in Technology by the Women in Tech global movement and in March 2021, she was included on Apolitical 100 Most Influential People in Gender Policy 2021.

Gülser Corat serves on the boards of Women’s Leadership Academy (China), International Advisory Committee for Diversity Promotion, Kobe University (Japan), UPenn Law School Global Women’s Leadership Project (USA), and is a member of Women Executives on Boards and Extraordinary Women on Boards.

Her story is featured in "The Courage To Advance: Real life resilience from the world’s most successful women in business"
