= Reverse correlation function =

Impulse response associated with auditory processing

A reverse correlation function, also known as a revcor function, is an impulse response function associated with the processing of hearing in the peripheral auditory system.

They can be modelled as bandpass filters, including by conventional filter architectures based on poles and zeros.

== See also ==
- Spike-triggered average
