= Gender bias in voice technology =

Topic in the field of feminist technoscience

Gender bias in voice technology is the use of female-sounding default voices in human-operated telephony, broadcast radio, prerecorded announcements, text-to-speech systems, voice assistants, and in artificial intelligence systems that are reported to marginalize women's voices and reinforce stereotypes of women as submissive, compliant, and servile. It is a topic in the field of feminist technoscience.

In the history of communication technology, beginning with telephony and the business office of the early 20th century, women were chosen over men for these roles because employers considered them more obedient and a form of cheap labor that would perform the work men refused to do. Early broadcast radio's limited frequency range privileged male voices by reproducing the higher-pitched components of women's voices less effectively. This contributed to perceptions that women's voices were harsh or shrill and reinforced gender-based barriers in radio. In spite of this, women proved that they were as good or better than men in the same roles. Meanwhile, the radio industry remained sexist for almost a century, preferring women on the air in roles related to home economics almost exclusively.

Over time, technology designed by men continued to marginalize female voices. Women, who had previously become associated with administrative support, found these same roles applied to artificial female voices, which was explained away as innate and natural with little evidence. Prerecorded announcements using feminine voices reinforced these roles, as male voices were used to deliver commands and authoritative instructions, while female voices were restricted to only giving information. These assumptions were later adapted for use in virtual assistants, reinforcing the culturally determined idea that women are best suited for support, not leadership roles.

== Human-operated telephony ==
A telephone operator wearing earphones and a mouth piece, New England Telephone and Telegraph Company, 1911.

The female voice became the standard in telephony in the 1880s. Telephone operators were initially boys, but only for a short time, as they were perceived as rude, disorderly and disruptive, and prone to playing pranks. They were replaced with young women who were described as obedient and were viewed as a cheap source of labor. The telephone industry preferred white, middle class women as operators for just under a century. At the same time, typewriters began to enter the business world. As with operators before them, the first typists were men, but by the 1890s, women were seen as cheaper labor and took on the gendered female role of secretaries.

Communications scholar Lana Rakow argues that, over time, women's voices were tailored, molded, and commodified by employers in the telephone company and business environment, who restricted their communication with customers through rigid training and rules, creating the standardized telephone operator voice. These same skills later transferred to secretarial work, where women worked as "telephonists" in offices. This role was similarly restrictive, limiting women's speech and reinforcing male hierarchies. Rakow notes that in both cases, men promoted the idea that women were naturally more suited to telephone work because of their "voice range and timbre."

However, women's roles, counters Rakow, were shaped less by innate qualities than by the prevailing economic systems and social norms of the time and the needs of male employers, who required women to speak and sound a certain way. By the 1960s and 1970s, Black women had became telephone operators in the United States, while non-white immigrants filled the same role in the United Kingdom. This shift away from the expectations of the "white voice" of female telephone operators was met with protests from Bell Telephone and racism and discrimination from white customers who had difficulty adjusting to different voices. As globalization expanded, gendered divisions of labor persisted, following the same patterns. Men were more likely to work in IT services and management, while women staffed call centers and provided customer service. The preference for the female voice in communication technologies remained high as technology advanced.

== Broadcast radio ==
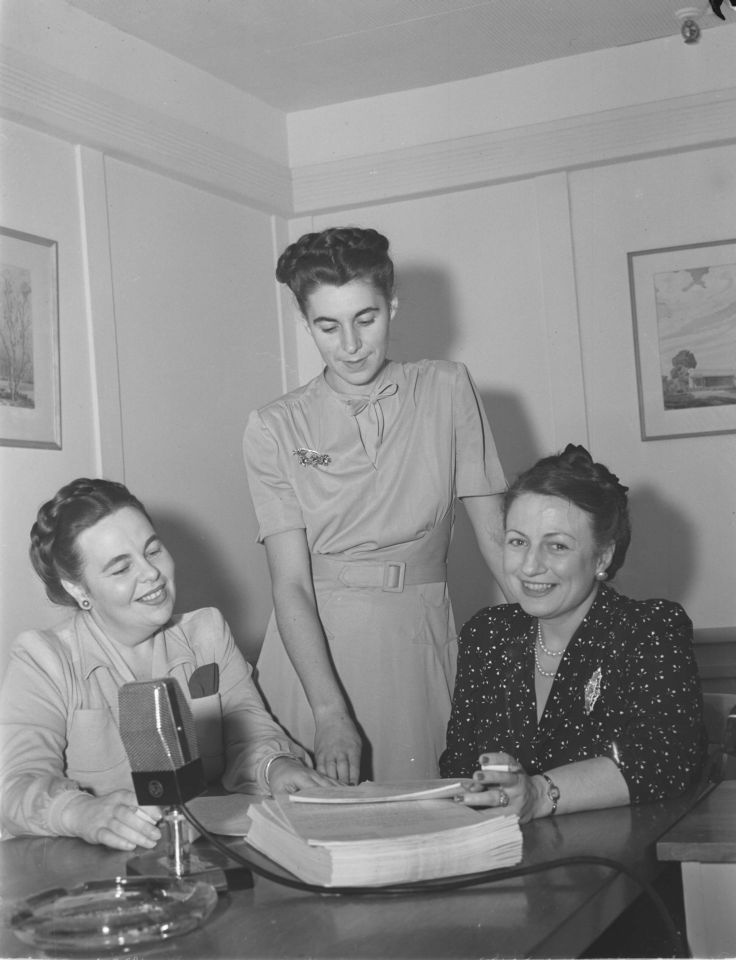
Marcelle Barthe (left), one of the first bilingual women radio hosts in Canada, 1945

As commercial radio broadcasting expanded and became popular in the 1920s, women's voices were increasingly marginalized. The equipment used to transmit voices was designed and optimized for lower-pitched male voices, with government regulation enforcing the very bandwidth that favored men's vocal range. Scientific research at the time also enforced gender bias in studies on voiceband frequency. This technology had the effect of making female voices sound unpleasant on the air by filtering out their unique vocal frequencies. The result was a feedback loop in which technology designed around male voices justified the exclusion of women from radio, while that exclusion itself was cited as proof that women's voices did not belong on the air in the first place.

Programming was also designed for gendered listeners, with daytime shows targeted for housewives and evening shows for men. Radio broadcaster Pauline Frederick, who held a master's degree in international law, was just one of many women in radio who faced gender bias in the industry, with her employer keeping her from working in radio on the air at first, telling her that "women's voices lack authority". She was later forced to lower the pitch of her voice to work in the industry. The glass ceiling was eventually broken by several pioneering women broadcasters who proved the assumptions about women's radio voices wrong, including Chicago DJ Halloween Martin, who hosted the successful morning radio program Musical Clock from 1929 to 1946, first on KYW, then later on WBBM. Martin's format and show was so successful that male DJs began to copy her. Nevertheless, radio executives refused to change their minds about women in radio. "They still believed", writes Sies & Sies, "that women's voices were affected and unpleasant".

== Speech synthesis ==
Researchers treated the problem of synthesizing speech as an information problem, ignoring gender altogether as a way to separate the voice from a human body for processing and transmission of functional information. Additionally, much of the initial research was based on male-typical voice characteristics. Bell Labs began working on the vocoder in 1928, followed by the analog voder in 1939, predating the release of the first general-purpose electronic digital computer by six years. This anticipated the abstraction of voice into data using computer-based speech synthesis in the 1950s, first as a proof of concept at Bell Labs, then famously on the IBM 7090 in 1961, where the song "Daisy Bell" became the earliest song to use computer speech synthesis for a singing voice. This abstraction of the human voice from identity and gender contributed to a lack of diversity in human synthesized voice types upon their deployment in commercial applications, further reinforcing gendered stereotypes.

== Prerecorded announcements ==
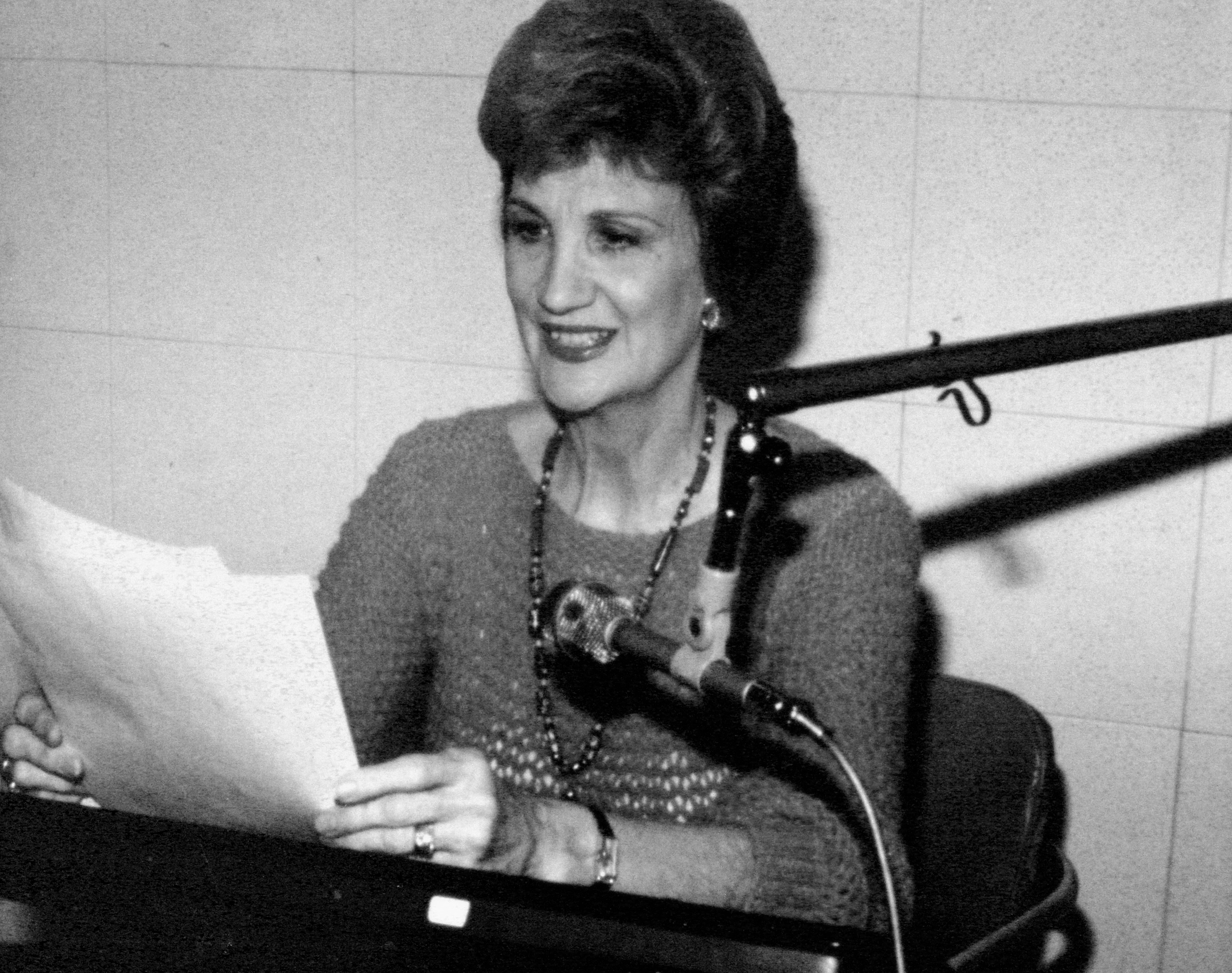
Jane Barbe, one of the original prerecorded voices for time, temperature, weather, and early voicemail systems

In the late 20th century, prerecorded female voices were increasingly used for announcements by the military in aircraft, by transportation networks, for security purposes, and for commercial transactions like ATMs.

The B-58 supersonic strategic bomber used a prerecorded female voice to deliver automated voice warnings to its all-male crew in the 1960s. Designers at the time believed that young men would be more attentive to a woman's voice in an emergency. B-58 pilots referred to the voice as "Sexy Sally". The F-15 fighter aircraft also used a female voice in its warning system in the 1970s; those pilots referred to it as "Bitching Betty". The term was not intended to be disparaging, but as an expression of affection for a system that could save their life. "Betty" was military slang for an attractive woman. A similar female voice alarm was also used in the F/A-18 multirole combat aircraft in the 1990s.

The New Technology Train (NTT) fleet of the New York City Subway began using prerecorded train announcements made by voice artists in both male and female versions in the year 2000. The male voices give orders while the female voices deliver informational messages to passengers. According to the Metropolitan Transportation Authority (MTA), these gendered roles were accidental. The MTA defended their voice design, controversially asserting that "psychologists agree that people are more receptive to orders from men and information from women."

== Text-to-speech (TTS) ==
Pat Fleet. Her voice was used for automated telephone announcements

In addition to the use of automated and recorded female voices, transportation systems began using text-to-speech (TTS) in the 2000s. Lucent Technologies designed a TTS system for Bay Area Rapid Transit (BART) as part of their Advanced Passenger Information System (APIS). The system uses two voices, George and Gracie, to help provide information for riders who are hearing and visually-impaired.

== Voice assistants ==
Until 2021, Apple's Siri defaulted to a female voice in the United States, while defaulting to a male voice where people spoke Arabic, British English, Dutch, or French. In that same year alone, voice assistants using female voices accounted for 92.4% of the smartphone sector in the United States. A United Nations study led by Saniye Gülser Corat in 2019 reported on gender bias in AI tools across the industry. Jessa Lingel and Kate Crawford note that the gendered role of the secretary from the 20th century is used to design virtual assistants and enforces the culturally-determined, subordinate role of the female. Kelly B. Wagman and Lisa Parks at the Massachusetts Institute of Technology reported in 2021 that the digital assistant Amazon Alexa was "gendered feminine and she performs historically feminized clerical labor."

== Research ==
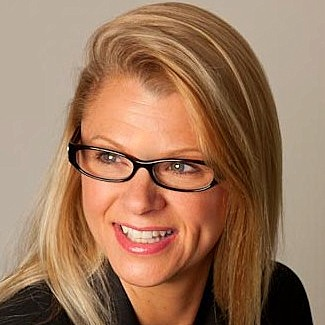
Jessica Ettinger, one of the voices of the New York City Subway

Scholars Donna Haraway, Judy Wajcman, and Londa Schiebinger, anticipated the concerns of technofeminism, with more recent scholars including Lauren Klein, and Catherine D'Ignazio, and many others, in fields as diverse as gender studies, science and technology studies, and feminist HCI and gender HCI.

Researchers suggest that the higher pitch of the female voice makes it easier to understand in noisy environments. This idea was investigated by the United States Army Medical Research and Materiel Command in 1995 to understand if there was a difference distinguishing male and female voices in cockpits above the sound of aircraft engines. The study found that the "statistically significant differences in intelligibility were so small as to indicate no difference in operational conditions."

Clifford Nass argued that preferences for gendered voices are reinforced in the womb and by culture. Nass cites studies showing that fetuses respond with recognition to the sound of their mother's voice, but not the sound of other female voices or their father. On the other hand, Nass found cultural preferences for male voices in Germany, where men objected to the use of a female voice in a navigation system tested in a BMW 5 Series. According to Nass at the time he consulted with BMW, "German male drivers...do not take directions from females." Except for Germany, most voice assisted GPS automotive navigation systems use female voices.

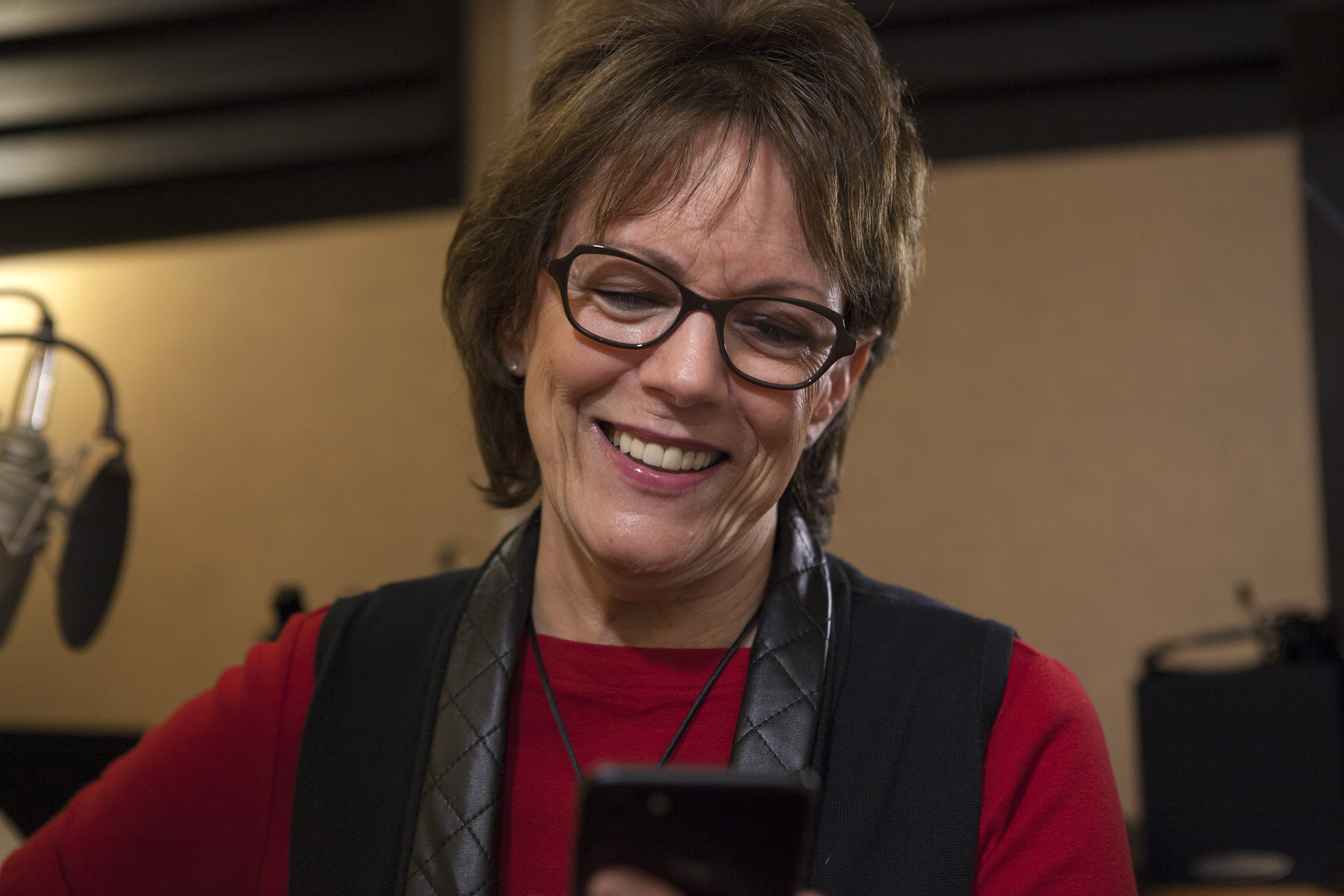
Susan Bennett, the original female voice of Siri

Other claims in favor of using the female voice argue it is more soothing and relaxing than a male voice, with some studies suggesting that female voices are perceived as more trustworthy. It is also argued that the female voice is perceived as helpful, docile, and servile, reinforcing stereotypes that women are best placed in supporting roles than the leadership roles given to men. Sarah A. Bell notes that until the 1980s, most of the technical research on speech synthesis suffered from a pattern of structural sexism, with most of the voice modeling research performed by men, using men as the ideal model, with 40 percent based on men alone, focusing on female speakers only 5 percent of the time.

The gender disparity in computing is explained as one contributing factor to the lack of gender neutrality in voice assistant training and design. HCI researcher Karl MacDorman suggests that there is an ethical problem that companies need to address. "Maybe they shouldn't be reinforcing the stereotypes but challenging them or being neutral on them."
