= Irene Sabadini =

Italian mathematician

Irene Maria Sabadini is an Italian mathematician specializing in complex analysis, hypercomplex analysis and the analysis of superoscillations. She is a professor of mathematics at the Polytechnic University of Milan, and head of the department of mathematics there.

== Education ==
Sabadini earned her PhD at the University of Milan in 1996. Her dissertation, Toward a Theory of Quaternionic Hyperfunctions, was supervised by Daniele C. Struppa.

== Books ==
Sabadini is the author of multiple books in mathematics including:

- Analysis of Dirac systems and computational algebra (with Colombo, Sommen, and Struppa, Birkhäuser 2004)
- Noncommutative functional calculus: Theory and applications of slice hyperholomorphic functions (with Colombo and Struppa, Birkhäuser/Springer, 2011)
- Entire slice regular functions (with Colombo and Struppa, Springer, 2016)
- Slice hyperholomorphic Schur analysis (with Alpay and Colombo, Birkhäuser/Springer, 2016)
- The mathematics of superoscillations (with Aharonov, Colombo, Struppa, and Tollaksen, American Mathematical Society, 2017)
- Quaternionic approximation: With application to slice regular functions (with Gal, Birkhäuser/Springer, 2019)
- Quaternionic de Branges spaces and characteristic operator function (Springer, 2020)
- Michele Sce's works in hypercomplex analysis: A translation with commentaries (with Colombo and Struppa, Birkhäuser/Springer, 2020)

She is also the editor or coeditor of multiple edited volumes.
