= Maximum entropy spectral estimation =

Spectral density estimation method

Maximum entropy spectral estimation is a method of spectral density estimation. The goal is to improve the spectral quality based on the principle of maximum entropy. The method is based on choosing the spectrum which corresponds to the most random or the most unpredictable time series whose autocorrelation function agrees with the known values. This assumption, which corresponds to the concept of maximum entropy as used in both statistical mechanics and information theory, is maximally non-committal with regard to the unknown values of the autocorrelation function of the time series. It is simply the application of maximum entropy modeling to any type of spectrum and is used in all fields where data is presented in spectral form. The usefulness of the technique varies based on the source of the spectral data since it is dependent on the amount of assumed knowledge about the spectrum that can be applied to the model.

In maximum entropy modeling, probability distributions are created on the basis of that which is known, leading to a type of statistical inference about the missing information which is called the maximum entropy estimate. For example, in spectral analysis the expected peak shape is often known, but in a noisy spectrum the center of the peak may not be clear. In such a case, inputting the known information allows the maximum entropy model to derive a better estimate of the center of the peak, thus improving spectral accuracy.

== Method description ==
In the periodogram approach to calculating the power spectra, the sample autocorrelation function is multiplied by some window function and then Fourier transformed. The window is applied to provide statistical stability as well as to avoid leakage from other parts of the spectrum. However, the window limits the spectral resolution.

The maximum entropy method attempts to improve the spectral resolution by extrapolating the correlation function beyond the maximum lag, in such a way that the entropy of the corresponding probability density function is maximized in each step of the extrapolation.

The maximum entropy rate stochastic process that satisfies the given empirical autocorrelation and variance constraints is an autoregressive model with independent and identically distributed zero-mean Gaussian input.

Therefore, the maximum entropy method is equivalent to least-squares fitting the available time series data to an autoregressive model

$$X_t = \sum_{k=1}^M \alpha_k X_{t-k} + \varepsilon_k$$

where the $\varepsilon_k$ are independent and identically distributed as $N(0, \sigma^2)$. The unknown coefficients $\alpha_k$ are found using the least-square method. Once the autoregressive coefficients have been determined, the spectrum of the time series data is estimated by evaluating the power spectral density function of the fitted autoregressive model

$$\hat{S}(\omega) = \frac{\sigma^2 T_s}{\left| 1 + \sum_{k=1}^M \alpha_k e^{- i k \omega T_s} \right|^2},$$

where $T_s$ is the sampling period and $i = \sqrt{-1}$ is the imaginary unit.
