= MUSIC (algorithm) =

Algorithm used for frequency estimation and radio direction finding

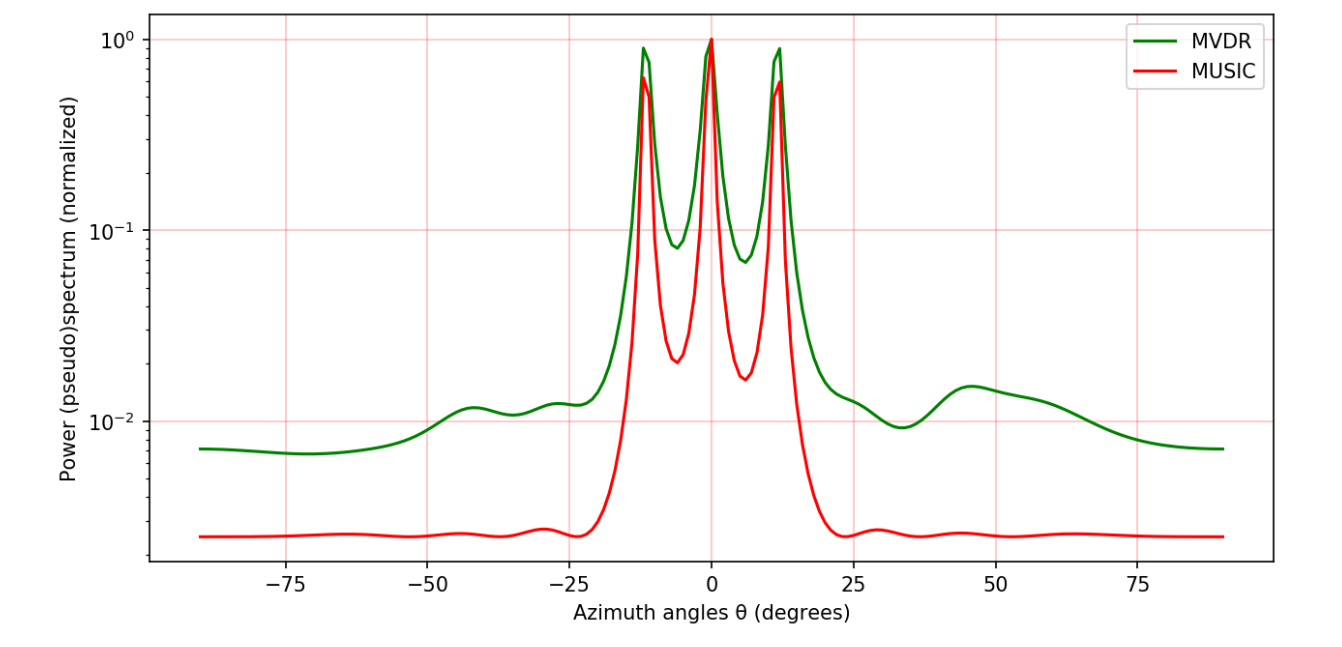
The radio direction finding by the MUSIC algorithm compared to MVDR/Capon

MUSIC (MUltiple SIgnal Classification) is an algorithm used for frequency estimation and radio direction finding.

== History ==
In many practical signal processing problems, the objective is to estimate from measurements a set of constant parameters upon which the received signals depend. There have been several approaches to such problems including the so-called maximum likelihood (ML) method of Capon (1969) and Burg's maximum entropy (ME) method. Although often successful and widely used, these methods have certain fundamental limitations (especially bias and sensitivity in parameter estimates), largely because they use an incorrect model (e.g., AR rather than special ARMA) of the measurements.

Pisarenko (1973) was one of the first to exploit the structure of the data model, doing so in the context of estimation of parameters of complex sinusoids in additive noise using a covariance approach. Schmidt (1977), while working at Northrop Grumman and independently Bienvenu and Kopp (1979) were the first to correctly exploit the measurement model in the case of sensor arrays of arbitrary form. Schmidt, in particular, accomplished this by first deriving a complete geometric solution in the absence of noise, then cleverly extending the geometric concepts to obtain a reasonable approximate solution in the presence of noise. The resulting algorithm was called MUSIC (multiple signal classification) and has been widely studied.

In a detailed evaluation based on thousands of simulations, the Massachusetts Institute of Technology's Lincoln Laboratory concluded in 1998 that, among currently accepted high-resolution algorithms, MUSIC was the most promising and a leading candidate for further study and actual hardware implementation. However, although the performance advantages of MUSIC are substantial, they are achieved at a cost in computation (searching over parameter space) and storage (of array calibration data).

== Theory ==
MUSIC method assumes that a signal vector, $\mathbf{x}$, consists of $p$ complex exponentials, whose frequencies $\omega$ are unknown, in the presence of Gaussian white noise, $\mathbf{n}$, as given by the linear model

$$\mathbf{x} = \mathbf{A} \mathbf{s} + \mathbf{n}.$$

Here $\mathbf{A} = [\mathbf{a}(\omega_1), \cdots, \mathbf{a}(\omega_p)]$ is an $M \times p$ Vandermonde matrix of steering vectors $\mathbf{a}(\omega) = [1, e^{j\omega}, e^{j2\omega}, \ldots, e^{j(M-1)\omega}]^T$ and $\mathbf{s} = [s_1, \ldots, s_p]^T$ is the amplitude vector. Note that that the formulation of the steering vector matrix as Vandermonde assumes the signals are incident on a uniform, linear array. Another crucial assumption is that number of sources, $p$, is less than the number of elements in the measurement vector, $M$, i.e. $p < M$.

The $M \times M$ autocorrelation matrix of $\mathbf{x}$ is then given by

$$\mathbf{R}_x = \mathbf{A} \mathbf{R}_s \mathbf{A}^H + \sigma^2 \mathbf{I},$$

where $\sigma^2$ is the noise variance, $\mathbf{I}$ is $M \times M$ identity matrix, and $\mathbf{R}_s$ is the $p \times p$ autocorrelation matrix of $\mathbf{s}$.

The autocorrelation matrix $\mathbf{R}_x$ is traditionally estimated using sample correlation matrix

$$\widehat{\mathbf{R}}_x = \frac{1}{N} \mathbf{X} \mathbf{X}^H$$

where:

$N > M$ is the number of vector observations,

$\mathbf{X} = [\mathbf{x}_1, \mathbf{x}_2, \ldots, \mathbf{x}_N]$ and

$\mathbf{X}^H$ denotes the conjugate transpose of $\mathbf{X}$

Given the estimate of $\mathbf{R}_x$, MUSIC estimates the frequency content of the signal or autocorrelation matrix using an eigenspace method.

Since $\mathbf{R}_x$ is a Hermitian matrix, all of its $M$ eigenvectors $\{\mathbf{v}_1, \mathbf{v}_2, \ldots, \mathbf{v}_M\}$ are orthogonal to each other. If the eigenvalues of $\mathbf{R}_x$ are sorted in decreasing order, the eigenvectors $\{\mathbf{v}_1, \ldots, \mathbf{v}_p\}$ corresponding to the $p$ largest eigenvalues (i.e. directions of largest variability) span the signal subspace $\mathcal{U}_S$. The remaining $M-p$ eigenvectors correspond to eigenvalue equal to $\sigma^2$ and span the noise subspace $\mathcal{U}_N$, which is orthogonal to the signal subspace, $\mathcal{U}_S \perp \mathcal{U}_N$.

Note that for $M = p + 1$, MUSIC is identical to Pisarenko harmonic decomposition. The general idea behind MUSIC method is to use all the eigenvectors that span the noise subspace to improve the performance of the Pisarenko estimator.

Since any signal vector $\mathbf{e}$ that resides in the signal subspace $\mathbf{e} \in \mathcal{U}_S$ must be orthogonal to the noise subspace, $\mathbf{e} \perp \mathcal{U}_N$, it must be that $\mathbf{e} \perp \mathbf{v}_i$ for all the eigenvectors $\{\mathbf{v}_i \}_{i=p+1}^M$ that spans the noise subspace. In order to measure the degree of orthogonality of $\mathbf{e}$ with respect to all the $\mathbf{v}_i \in \mathcal{U}_N$, the MUSIC algorithm defines a squared norm

$$d^2 = \| \mathbf{U}_N^H \mathbf{e} \|^2 = \mathbf{e}^H \mathbf{U}_N \mathbf{U}_N^H \mathbf{e} = \sum_{i=p+1}^{M} |\mathbf{e}^{H} \mathbf{v}_i|^2$$

where the matrix $\mathbf{U}_N = [\mathbf{v}_{p+1}, \ldots, \mathbf{v}_{M}]$ is the matrix of eigenvectors that span the noise subspace $\mathcal{U}_N$. If $\mathbf{e} \in \mathcal{U}_S$, then $d^2 = 0$ as implied by the orthogonality condition. Taking a reciprocal of the squared norm expression creates sharp peaks at the signal frequencies. The frequency estimation function for MUSIC (or the pseudo-spectrum) is

$$\hat P_{MU}(e^{j \omega}) = \frac{1}{\mathbf{e}^H \mathbf{U}_N \mathbf{U}_N^H \mathbf{e}} = \frac{1}{\sum_{i=p+1}^{M} |\mathbf{e}^{H} \mathbf{v}_i|^2},$$

where $\mathbf{v}_i$ are the noise eigenvectors and

$$\mathbf{e} = \begin{bmatrix}1 & e^{j \omega} & e^{j 2 \omega} & \cdots & e^{j (M-1) \omega}\end{bmatrix}^T$$

is the candidate steering vector. The locations of the $p$ largest peaks of the estimation function give the frequency estimates for the $p$ signal components

$$\hat{\omega} = \arg\max_\omega \; \hat P_{MU}(e^{j \omega}).$$

MUSIC is a generalization of Pisarenko's method, and it reduces to Pisarenko's method when $M=p+1$. In Pisarenko's method, only a single eigenvector is used to form the denominator of the frequency estimation function; and the eigenvector is interpreted as a set of autoregressive coefficients, whose zeros can be found analytically or with polynomial root finding algorithms. In contrast, MUSIC assumes that several such functions have been added together, so zeros may not be present. Instead there are local minima, which can be located by computationally searching the estimation function for peaks.

== Dimension of signal space ==
The fundamental observation MUSIC and other subspace decomposition methods are based on is about the rank of the autocorrelation matrix $\mathbf{R}_x$ which is related to number of signal sources $p$ as follows.

If the sources are complex, then $M > p$ and the dimension of the signal subspace $\mathcal{U}_S$ is $p$. If sources are real, then $M > 2p$ and dimension of the signal subspace is $2p$, i.e. each real sinusoid is generated by two base vectors.

This fundamental result, although often skipped in spectral analysis books, is a reason why the input signal can be distributed into $p$ signal subspace eigenvectors spanning $\mathcal{U}_S$ ($2p$ for real valued signals) and noise subspace eigenvectors spanning $\mathcal{U}_N$. It is based on signal embedding theory and can also be explained by the topological theory of manifolds.

== Comparison to other methods ==
MUSIC outperforms simple methods such as picking peaks of DFT spectra in the presence of noise, when the number of components is known in advance, because it exploits knowledge of this number to ignore the noise in its final report.

Unlike DFT, it is able to estimate frequencies with accuracy higher than one sample, because its estimation function can be evaluated for any frequency, not just those of DFT bins. This is a form of superresolution.

Its chief disadvantage is that it requires the number of components to be known in advance, so the original method cannot be used in more general cases. Methods exist for estimating the number of source components purely from statistical properties of the autocorrelation matrix. See, e.g. In addition, MUSIC assumes coexistent sources to be uncorrelated, which limits its practical applications.

Recent iterative semi-parametric methods offer robust superresolution despite highly correlated sources, e.g., SAMV

A further limitation is the requirement for multiple observation snapshots. The standard MUSIC algorithm estimates the autocorrelation matrix R_{x} from L independent snapshots via temporal averaging. For an M-element array, the sample covariance matrix constructed from a single snapshot (L = 1) has rank one, which is insufficient for decomposing the observation space into signal and noise subspaces when more than one signal is present. Reliable subspace separation typically requires L ≥ 2M snapshots. This multi-snapshot requirement introduces latency and limits the applicability of MUSIC in rapidly changing environments where the signal parameters may vary between snapshots. Several approaches have been developed to reduce or eliminate this requirement, including spatial smoothing for uniform linear arrays, and single-snapshot methods based on Hankel or Toeplitz matrix constructions that exploit the shift-invariant structure of the array manifold.

== Variants ==
A modified version of MUSIC, denoted as time-reversal MUSIC (TR-MUSIC) has been recently applied to computational time-reversal imaging.

== Other applications ==
MUSIC algorithm has been implemented as an open-source C library (libmusic) as well as an identically-named MATLAB implementation. Although originally developed to detect and remove DTMF tones, both are applicable to a any number of frequency components.

== See also ==
- Spectral density estimation
- Periodogram
- Matched filter
- Welch's method
- Bartlett's method
- SAMV (algorithm)
- Radio direction finding
- Pitch detection algorithm
- High-resolution microscopy
