= NORSAR =

Norwegian research foundation

NORSAR logo

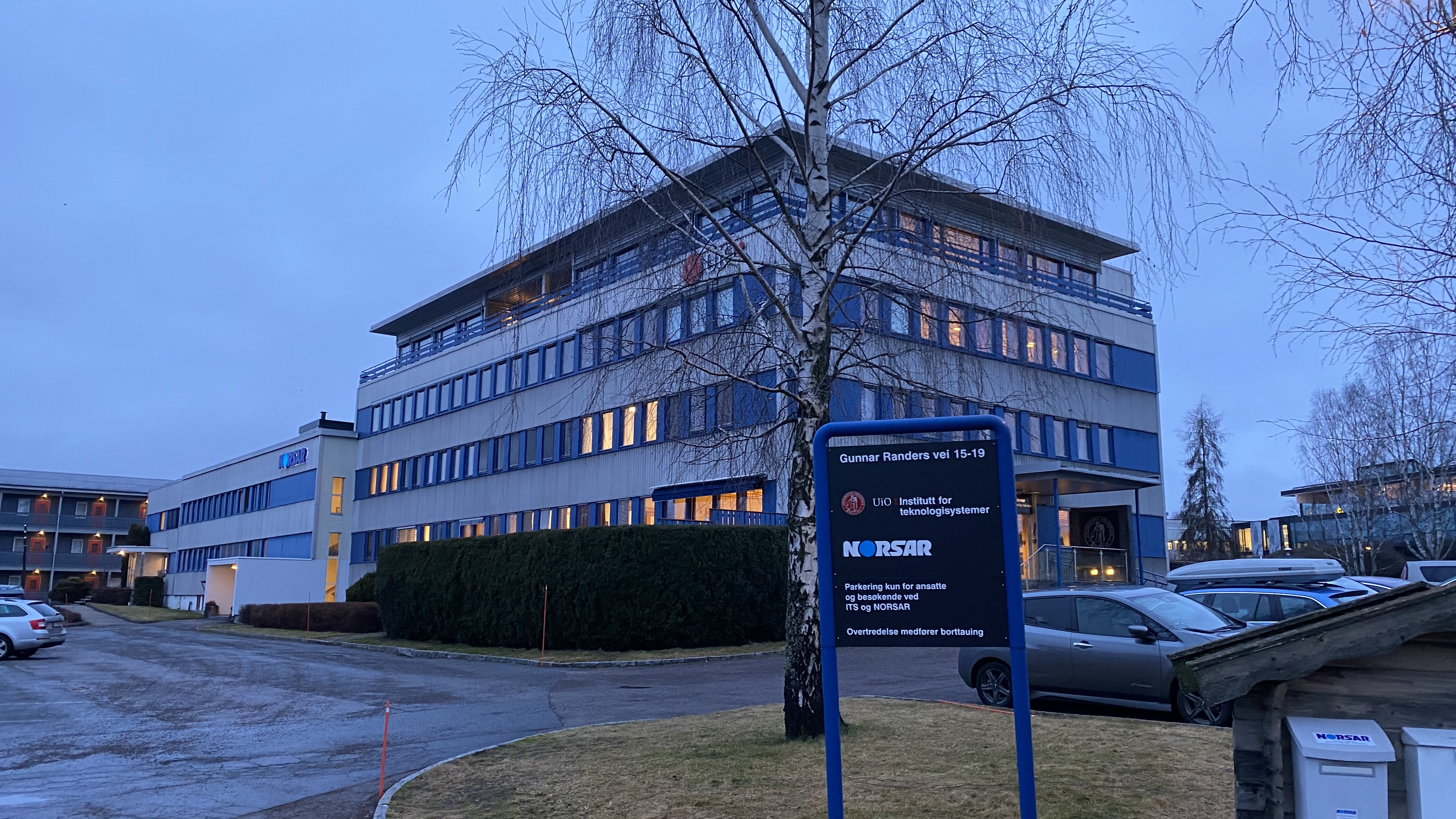
NORSAR in Kjeller, Norway

NORSAR is a foundation established in 1968 as part of the Norwegian–US agreement for the detection of earthquakes and nuclear explosions. The name derives from the foundation's original project, the Norwegian Seismic Array.

== Description ==
Located at Kjeller, north of Oslo, NORSAR runs and maintains seismic arrays in Norway and it is the designated Norwegian National Data Centre for the Comprehensive Nuclear-Test-Ban Treaty. NORSAR conducts basic seismological research, develops software and provides consultancy for the petroleum industry.

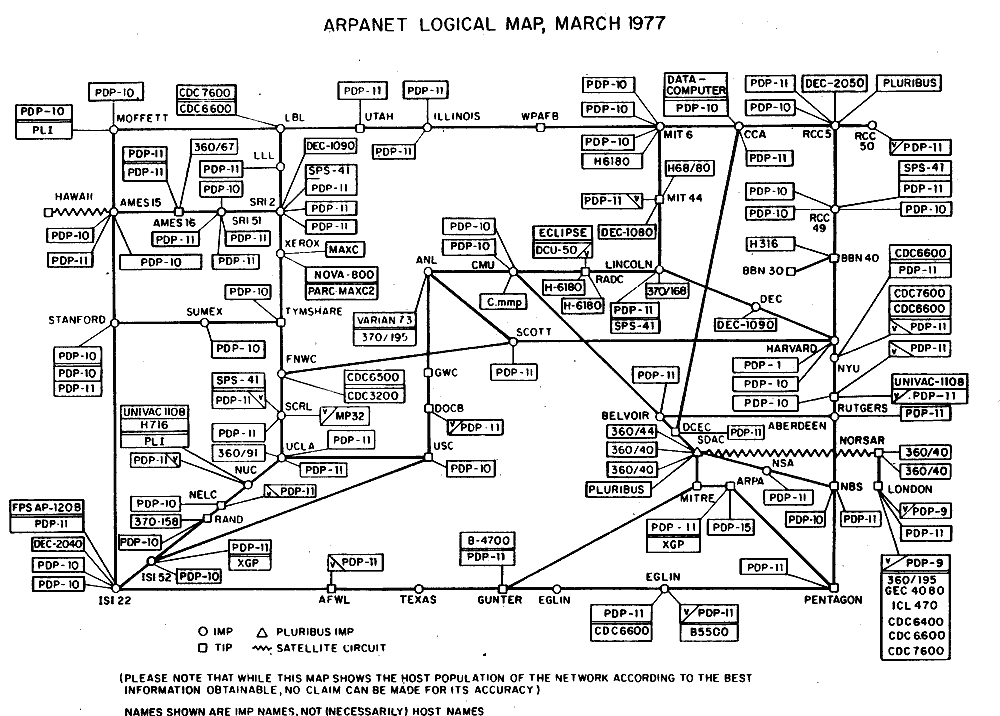
ARPANET logical map, 1977. NORSAR is located at lower right.

NORSAR was the first non-US site included in ARPANET in June 1973. Its connection went via the Tanum Earth Station in Sweden to the Seismic Data Analysis Center (SDAC) in Virginia, United States. In turn, NORSAR provided the connection point for ARPANET to spread to Peter Kirstein's research group at University College London (UCL) the following month in July 1973. Connecting through NORSAR, the Norwegian Defence Research Establishment (NDRE), along with UCL and RSRE in Britain, were involved in testing TCP/IP. UCL provided a gateway between the ARPANET and UK academic computer networks, the first heterogenous international computer network. In early 1982, NORSAR and UCL left the ARPANET and began to use TCP/IP over SATNET, becoming two of the first nodes on the Internet.

Since 1999, NORSAR has been an independent research foundation.

== See also ==
- NORDUnet
