= Superoscillation =

Superoscillation is a phenomenon in which a signal which is globally band-limited can contain local segments that oscillate faster than its fastest Fourier components. The idea is originally attributed to Yakir Aharonov, and has been made more popularly known through the work of Michael Berry, who also notes that a similar result was known to Ingrid Daubechies.

In 2007, Huang experimentally observed optical superoscillation phenomenon in the diffraction patterns of light transmitted through quasi-periodic nanohole arrays. Optical foci much smaller than the diffraction limit were observed. The results matched simulations without evanescent waves. In 2009, Huang et al further developed theoretical models to design superoscillation masks that can achieve extreme light concentration and imaging with arbitrary resolution. A practical method for constructing superoscillations and a discussion of their potential for quantum field theory were given by Achim Kempf. Chremmos and Fikioris have proposed a method for constructing superoscillations that approximate a desired polynomial with arbitrary accuracy within a given interval. In 2013 experimental generation of arbitrarily shaped diffractionless superoscillatory optical beams has been demonstrated. Two years later, in 2015, it was shown experimentally that super-oscillations can generate features that are many-fold smaller than the diffraction limit. The experiment was done using visible light, demonstrating enhanced resolution of 35 nm. Kempf and Ferreira proved that superoscillations come at the expense of a dynamical range that has to increase exponentially with the number of superoscillations and polynomially with the frequency of the superoscillations.

Superoscillatory wave forms are being considered as a possible practical tool for engineering applications, such as optical superresolution, i.e., resolution beyond the diffraction limit.

== See also ==
- Nyquist rate
- Optical superresolution
