= Bartlett's method =

Algorithm in digital signal processing

In time series analysis, Bartlett's method (also known as the method of averaged periodograms), is used for estimating power spectra. It provides a way to reduce the variance of the periodogram in exchange for a reduction of resolution, compared to standard periodograms. A final estimate of the spectrum at a given frequency is obtained by averaging the estimates from the periodograms (at the same frequency) derived from non-overlapping portions of the original series.

The method is used in physics, engineering, and applied mathematics. Common applications of Bartlett's method are frequency response measurements and general spectrum analysis.

The method is named after M. S. Bartlett who first proposed it.

== Definition and procedure ==
The linear spectrum calculated by Bartlett's method.

Bartlett's method consists of the following steps:

1. The original N point data segment is split up into K (non-overlapping) data segments, each of length M
2. For each segment, compute the periodogram by computing the discrete Fourier transform (DFT version which does not divide by M), then computing the squared magnitude of the result and dividing this by M.
3. Average the result of the periodograms above for the K data segments.
  1. The averaging reduces the variance, compared to the original N point data segment.

The result is an array of power measurements vs. frequency "bin".

== Related methods ==
- The Welch method: this is a method that uses a modified version of Bartlett's method in which the portions of the series contributing to each periodogram are allowed to overlap.
- Periodogram smoothing.
