= Bicoherence =

Measure of phase coupling in a signal

In mathematics and statistical analysis, bicoherence (also known as bispectral coherency) is a squared normalised version of the bispectrum. The bicoherence takes values bounded between 0 and 1, which make it a convenient measure for quantifying the extent of phase coupling in a signal. The prefix bi- in bispectrum and bicoherence refers not to two time series x_{t}, y_{t} but rather to two frequencies of a single signal.

The bispectrum is a statistic used to search for nonlinear interactions. The Fourier transform of the second-order cumulant, i.e., the autocorrelation function, is the traditional power spectrum. The Fourier transform of C_{3}(t_{1},t_{2}) (third-order cumulant) is called bispectrum or bispectral density. They fall in the category of Higher Order Spectra, or Polyspectra and provide supplementary information to the power spectrum. The third order polyspectrum (bispectrum) is the easiest to compute, and hence the most popular.

The difference with measuring coherence (coherence analysis is an extensively used method to study the correlations in frequency domain, between two simultaneously measured signals) is the need for both input and output measurements by estimating two auto-spectra and one cross spectrum. On the other hand, bicoherence is an auto-quantity, i.e. it can be computed from a single signal. The coherence function provides a quantification of deviations from linearity in the system which lies between the input and output measurement sensors. The bicoherence measures the proportion of the signal energy at any bifrequency that is quadratically phase coupled. It is usually normalized in the range similar to correlation coefficient and classical (second order) coherence. It was also used for depth of anasthesia assessment and widely in plasma physics (nonlinear energy transfer) and also for detection of gravitational waves.

Bispectrum and bicoherence may be applied to the case of non-linear interactions of a continuous spectrum of propagating waves in one dimension.

Bicoherence measurements have been carried out for EEG signals monitoring in sleep, wakefulness and seizures.

== Definition ==
The bispectrum is defined as the triple product

$$B(f_1,f_2) = F(f_1)F(f_2)F^*(f_1+f_2)$$

where $B$ is the bispectrum evaluated at frequencies $f_1$ and $f_2$, $F$ is the Fourier transform of the signal, and $^*$ denotes the complex conjugate. The Fourier transform is a complex quantity, and so is the bispectrum. From complex multiplication, the magnitude of the bispectrum is equal to the product of the magnitudes of each of the frequency components, and the phase of the bispectrum is the sum of the phases of each of the frequency components.

Suppose that the three Fourier components $F(f_1)$, $F(f_2)$ and $F(f_1 + f_2)$ were perfectly phase locked. Then if the Fourier transform was calculated several times from different parts of the time series, the bispectrum will always have the same value. If we add together all of the bispectra, they will sum without cancelling. On the other hand, suppose that the phases of each of these frequencies was random. Then, the bispectrum will have the same magnitude (assuming that the magnitude of the frequency components is the same) but the phase will be randomly oriented. Adding together all of the bispectra will result in cancellation, because of the random phase orientation, and so the sum of the bispectra will have a small magnitude. Detecting phase coupling requires summation over a number of independent samples- this is the first motivation for defining the bicoherence. Secondly, the bispectrum is not normalized, because it still depends on the magnitudes of each of the frequency components. The bicoherence includes a normalization factor that removes the magnitude dependence.

There is some inconsistency with the definition of the bicoherence normalization constant. Some of the definitions that have been used are

$$b(f_1,f_2) = \frac{\left| \sum\limits_{n} F_n(f_1)F_n(f_2)F_n^*(f_1+f_2) \right|}{ \sqrt{\sum\limits_{n} |F_n(f_1)|^2|F_n(f_2)|^2|F_n^*(f_1+f_2)|^2}}$$

which was provided in Sigl and Chamoun 1994, but does not appear to be correctly normalized. Alternatively, plasma physics typically uses

$$b^2(f_1,f_2) = \frac{|\langle F_n(f_1)F_n(f_2)F_n^*(f_1+f_2) \rangle|^2}{ \langle |F_n(f_1)F_n(f_2)|^2 \rangle\langle |F_n^*(f_1+f_2)|^2\rangle}$$

where the angle brackets denote averaging. Note that this is the same as using a sum, because $n$ is the same in the numerator and the denominator. This definition is directly from Nagashima 2006, and is also referred to in He 2009 and Maccarone 2005.

Finally, one of the most intuitive definitions comes from Hagihira 2001 and Hayashi 2007, which is

$$b(f_1,f_2) = \frac{\left| \sum\limits_{n} F_n(f_1)F_n(f_2)F_n^*(f_1+f_2) \right|}{ \sum\limits_{n} |F_n(f_1)F_n(f_2)F_n^*(f_1+f_2)|}$$

The numerator contains the magnitude of the bispectrum summed over all of the time series segments. This quantity is large if there is phase coupling, and approaches 0 in the limit of random phases. The denominator, which normalizes the bispectrum, is given by calculating the bispectrum after setting all of the phases to 0. This corresponds to the case where there is perfect phase coupling, because all of the samples have zero phase. Therefore, the bicoherence has a value between 0 (random phases) and 1 (total phase coupling).

The bicoherence can also be used to study signals sampled in space, by substituting time $t$ with spatial coordinate $x$, and temporal frequency $f$ for the spatial wavenumber $k$. More generally, for signals sampled in both space and time, a spatiotemporal bicoherence may be defined. Starting from the spatiotemporal bispectrum

$B(f_1,f_2,k_1,k_2) = F(f_1, k_1)F(f_2, k_2)F^*(f_1+f_2, k_1+k_2)$

the corresponding spatiotemporal bicoherence (using the Hagihira-Hayashi normalization) is

$b(f_1,f_2, k_1, k_2) = \frac{\left| \sum\limits_{n} F_n(f_1, k_1)F_n(f_2, k_2)F_n^*(f_1+f_2, k_1+k_2) \right|}{ \sum\limits_{n} |F_n(f_1,k_1)F_n(f_2, k_2)F_n^*(f_1+f_2, k_1+k_2)|}$

The spatiotemporal bicoherence has been demonstrated to be related to its "reduced" spatial and temporal versions, following the orthogonality relations of the Fourier transform

== A physical interpretation ==
Among the three normalizations above, the second one can be interpreted as a correlation coefficient defined between energy-supplying and energy-receiving parties in a second order nonlinear interaction, whereas the bispectrum has been proven to be the corresponding covariance. Therefore, just as correlation cannot sufficiently demonstrate the presence of causality, a significant bicoherence peak also cannot sufficiently substantiate the existence of a nonlinear interaction.

== See also ==
- Coherence (signal processing)
- Polyspectra (higher order spectra)
