= Higher-order statistics =

In statistics, the term higher-order statistics (HOS) refers to functions which use the third or higher power of a sample, as opposed to more conventional techniques of lower-order statistics, which use constant, linear, and quadratic terms (zeroth, first, and second powers). The third and higher moments, as used in the skewness and kurtosis, are examples of HOS, whereas the first and second moments, as used in the arithmetic mean (first), and variance (second) are examples of low-order statistics. HOS are particularly used in the estimation of shape parameters, such as skewness and kurtosis, as when measuring the deviation of a distribution from the normal distribution.

In statistical theory, one long-established approach to higher-order statistics, for univariate and multivariate distributions is through the use of cumulants and joint cumulants. In time series analysis, the extension of these is to polyspectra (higher order spectra), for example the bispectrum and trispectrum.

An alternative to the use of HOS and higher moments is to instead use L-moments, which are linear statistics (linear combinations of order statistics), and thus more robust than HOS.
