= Intermuscular coherence =

Intermuscular Coherence is a measure to quantify correlations between the activity of two muscles, which is often assessed using electromyography. The correlations in muscle activity are quantified in frequency domain, and therefore referred to as intermuscular coherence.

== History ==
The synchronisation of motor units of a single muscle in animals and humans are known for decades. The early studies that investigated the relationship of EMG activity used time-domain cross-correlation to quantify common input. The explicit notion of presence of synchrony between motor units of two different muscles was reported at a later time. In the 1990s, coherence analysis was introduced to examine in frequency content of common input.

== Physiology ==
Intermuscular coherence can be used to investigate the neural circuitry involved in motor control. Correlated muscle activity indicates common input to the motor unit pools of both muscles and reflects shared neural pathways (including cortical, subcortical and spinal) that contribute to muscle activity and movement. The strength of intermuscular coherence is dependent on the relationship between muscles and is generally stronger between muscle pairs that are anatomically and functionally closely related. Intermuscular coherence can therefore be used to identify impairments in motor pathways.

== See also ==
- Corticomuscular coherence
- Corticocortical coherence
