= Corticomuscular coherence =

Corticomuscular coherence relates to the synchrony in the neural activity of brain's cortical areas and muscle. The neural activities are picked up by electrophysiological recordings from the brain (e.g. EEG, MEG, ECoG, etc.) and muscle (EMG). It is a method to study the neural control of movement.

== Physiology ==
Corticomuscular coherence was initially reported between MEG and EMG and is widely studied between EMG and EEG, MEG, etc.

The origins of corticomuscular coherence seem to be communication in corticospinal pathways between primary motor cortex and muscles. While the role of descending corticomuscular pathways in generation of coherence are more clear, the role of ascending sensory spinocortical pathways are less certain.

Corticomuscular coherence has been of special interest in alpha band (about 10 Hz), in Beta band (15–30 Hz), and in Gamma band (35–60 Hz).

== Mathematics and statistics ==
A classic and commonly used approach to assess the synchrony between neural signals is to use Coherence.

Statistical significance of coherence is found as function of number of data segments with assumption of the signals' normal distribution. Alternatively non-parametric techniques such as bootstrapping can be used.

== Computational models ==
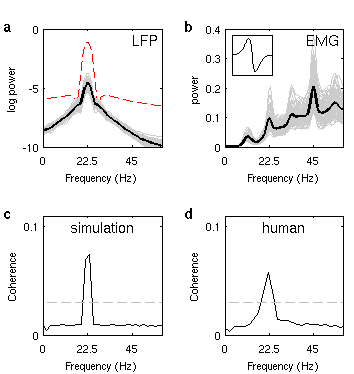
Modeling corticomuscular coherence. (a) Power spectrum of simulated local field potential, (b) Power spectrum of simulated electromyogram. (c) Simulated corticomuscular coherence. (d) Human corticomuscular coherence data.

Corticomuscular coherence has been simulated in models which posit that motor commands are encoded in the spatial pattern of beta band synchronization patterns in motor cortex. Specific cortical oscillation patterns can be spatially filtered by the dendritic arbors of the corticospinal fibers to selectively shape the descending drive to the motoneurons in the spinal cord. Cortical oscillations can thus be translated into steady muscle forces which are maintained for the duration of the oscillation pattern. Although the oscillations serve only as the carrier for the motor command, weak traces of the beta oscillation are still transmitted to the muscle. These traces appear as weak levels of beta band corticomuscular coherence which are consistent with those observed in physiology.

== See also ==
- Intermuscular coherence
- Corticocortical coherence
