= Corticocortical coherence =

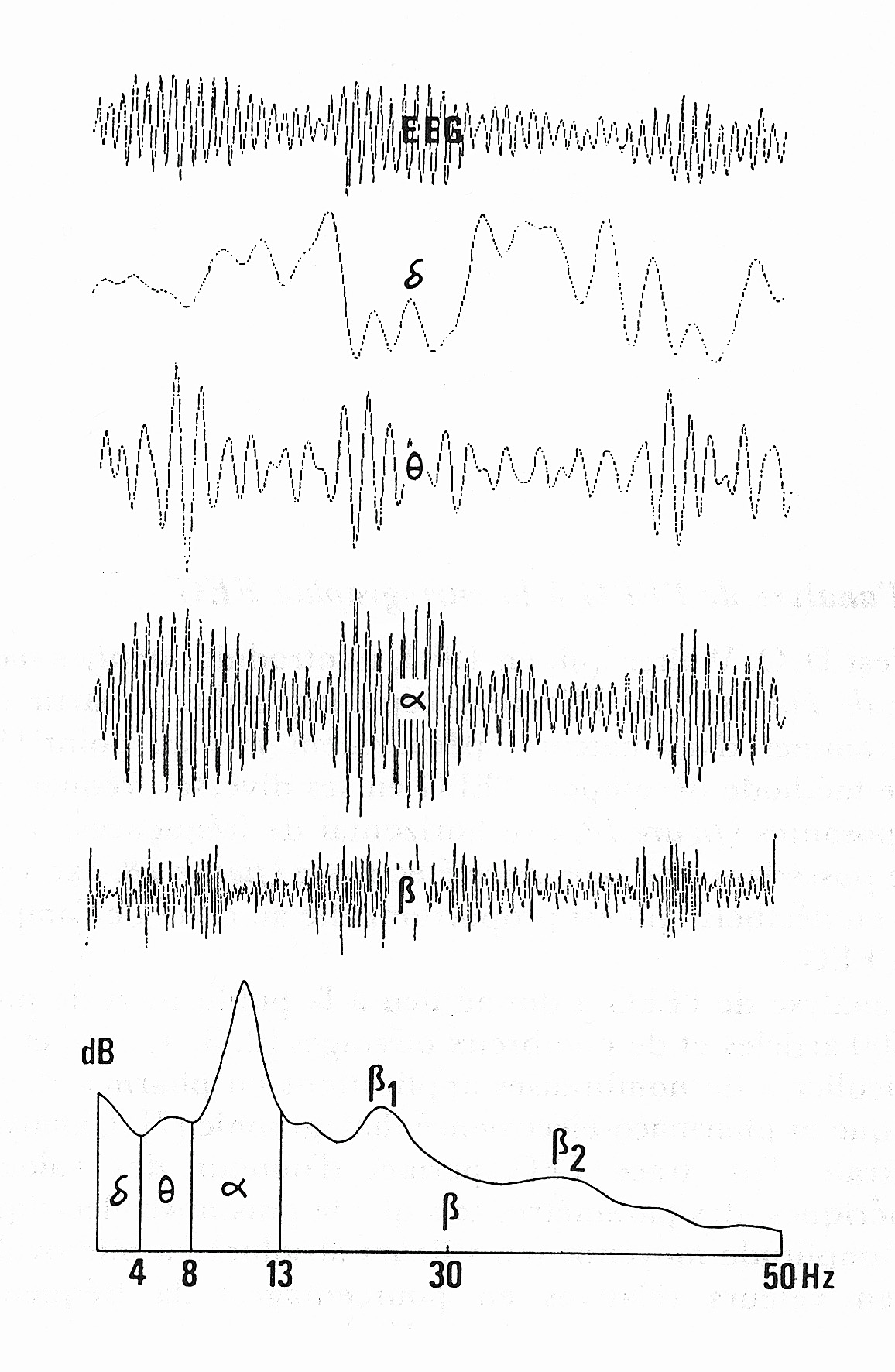
EEG spectral analysis

Corticocortical coherence refers to the synchrony in the neural activity of different cortical brain areas. The neural activities are picked up by electrophysiological recordings from the brain (e.g. EEG, MEG, ECoG, etc.). It is a method to study the brain's neural communication and function at rest or during functional tasks.

== History and basics ==
Initial applications of spectral analysis for finding the relationship between the EEG recordings from different regions of scalp dates back to 1960's. Corticocortical coherence has since been extensively studied using EEG and MEG recording for potential diagnostic applications and beyond.

The exact origins of corticocortical coherence are under active investigation. While the consensus suggests that the functional neural communication between distinct brain sources leads to synchronous activity in those regions (possibly connected by neural tracts, in either direct or indirect way), an alternative explanation emphasises on single focal oscillations that occur at single brain sources that eventually appear connected or synchronous in different scalp or brain source regions.

Corticocortical coherence has been of special interest in delta, theta, alpha, beta and gamma frequency bands (commonly used for EEG studies).

== Methods, mathematics and statistics ==
Cortico-cortical coherence is commonly studied using bipolar channels of EEG recordings, as well as unipolar channels of EEG or MEG signals; however, unipolar channels are usually used to estimate the brain sources and their connectivity, using electrical source imaging and connectivity analysis.

A classic and commonly used approach to assess the synchrony between neural signals is to use Coherence.

Statistical significance of coherence is found as function of number of data segments with assumption of the signals' normal distribution. Alternatively non-parametric techniques such as bootstrapping can be used.

== In pathological conditions ==
In clinical settings, coherence analysis has been used to study brain development and assess conditions affecting connectivity, including cortical and subcortical dementia, schizophrenia, and corpus callosum lesions. Decreased coherence in high-frequency bands is typically interpreted as reduced cortico-cortical functional connectivity, but the significance of coherence increases remains unclear. While coherence analysis can differentiate patient groups from healthy controls, its specificity across different pathological conditions is limited, and its diagnostic utility for individual patients remains uncertain

== Sex Differences ==
Using magnetoencephalography (MEG) and electroencephalography (EEG) to assess imaginary coherence, females exhibited minimal differences in imaginary coherence. Their task planning relied on general attention and efficient, balanced processing, which was attributed to higher overall functional cortical connectivity.

== See also ==
- Intermuscular coherence
- Corticomuscular coherence
