= Marc-Antoine Parseval =

French mathematician (1755–1836)

Marc-Antoine Parseval des Chênes
- Born: 27 April 1755; Rosières-aux-Salines, France
- Died: 16 August 1836 (aged 81)
- Known for: Parseval's theorem Parseval's identity
- Scientific career
- Fields: Mathematics

Marc-Antoine Parseval des Chênes (27 April 1755 – 16 August 1836) was a French mathematician, most famous for what is now known as Parseval's theorem, which showed that the Fourier transform is unitary.

He was born in Rosières-aux-Salines, France, into an aristocratic French family, and married Ursule Guerillot in 1795, but divorced her soon after. A monarchist opposed to the French Revolution, imprisoned in 1792, Parseval later fled the country for publishing poetry critical of the government of Napoleon.

Later, he was nominated to the French Academy of Sciences five times, from 1796 to 1828, but was never elected. His only mathematical publications were apparently five papers, published in 1806 as Mémoires présentés à l'Institut des Sciences, Lettres et Arts, par divers savants, et lus dans ses assemblées. Sciences mathématiques et physiques. (Savants étrangers.) This combined the following earlier monographs:

1. "Mémoire sur la résolution des équations aux différences partielles linéaires du second ordre," (5 May 1798).
2. "Mémoire sur les séries et sur l'intégration complète d'une équation aux différences partielles linéaires du second ordre, à coefficients constants," (5 April 1799).
3. "Intégration générale et complète des équations de la propagation du son, l'air étant considéré avec ses trois dimensions," (5 July 1801).
4. "Intégration générale et complète de deux équations importantes dans la mécanique des fluides," (16 August 1803).
5. "Méthode générale pour sommer, par le moyen des intégrales définies, la suite donnée par le théorème de M. Lagrange, au moyen de laquelle il trouve une valeur qui satisfait à une équation algébrique ou transcendante," (7 May 1804).

It was in the second 1799, memoir in which he stated, but did not prove (claiming it to be self-evident), the theorem that now bears his name. He further expanded it upon his 1801 memoir, and used it to solve various differential equations. The theorem was first printed in 1800 as a part (p. 377) of Traité des différences et des séries by Lacroix.

== See also ==
- Parseval's identity
- Parseval's theorem
