= Welch's method =

Method of spectral density estimation

Welch's method, named after Peter D. Welch, is an approach for spectral density estimation. It is used in physics, engineering, and applied mathematics for estimating the power of a signal at different frequencies. The method is based on the concept of using periodogram spectrum estimates, which are the result of converting a signal from the time domain to the frequency domain. Welch's method is an improvement on the standard periodogram spectrum estimating method and on Bartlett's method, in that it reduces noise in the estimated power spectra in exchange for reducing the frequency resolution. Due to the noise caused by imperfect and finite data, the noise reduction from Welch's method is often desired.

== Definition and procedure ==
The Welch method is based on Bartlett's method and differs in two ways:

1. The signal is split up into overlapping segments: the original data segment is split up into L data segments of length M, overlapping by D points.
  1. If D = M / 2, the overlap is said to be 50%
  2. If D = 0, the overlap is said to be 0%. This is the same situation as in the Bartlett's method.
2. The overlapping segments are then windowed: After the data is split up into overlapping segments, the individual L data segments have a window applied to them (in the time domain).
  1. Most window functions afford more influence to the data at the center of the set than to data at the edges, which represents a loss of information. To mitigate that loss, the individual data sets are commonly overlapped in time (as in the above step).
  2. The windowing of the segments is what makes the Welch method a "modified" periodogram.

After doing the above, the periodogram is calculated by computing the discrete Fourier transform, and then computing the squared magnitude of the result, yielding power spectrum estimates for each segment. The individual spectrum estimates are then averaged, which reduces the variance of the individual power measurements. The end result is an array of power measurements vs. frequency "bin".

== Related approaches ==
Other overlapping windowed Fourier transforms include:

- Modified discrete cosine transform
- Short-time Fourier transform

== See also ==
- Fast Fourier transform
- Power spectrum
- Estimation of Polyspectra
- Spectral density estimation
