= Ergodic (disambiguation) =

Aside from its generic use as the generic adjective ergodic, ergodic may relate to:

- Ergodicity, mathematical description of a dynamical system which, broadly speaking, has the same behavior averaged over time as averaged over the space of all the system's states (phase space)
- Ergodic hypothesis, a postulate of thermodynamics
- Ergodic theory, a branch of mathematics
- Ergodic literature, literature that requires special effort to navigate
- Ergodic process, a particular type of stochastic processes
