= Bessel's inequality =

Theorem on orthonormal sequences

In mathematics, especially functional analysis, Bessel's inequality is a statement about the coefficients of an element $x$ in a Hilbert space with respect to an orthonormal sequence. The inequality is named for F. W. Bessel, who derived a special case of it in 1828.

Conceptually, the inequality is a generalization of the Pythagorean theorem to infinite-dimensional spaces. It states that the "energy" of a vector $x$, given by $\|x\|^2$, is greater than or equal to the sum of the energies of its projections onto a set of perpendicular basis directions. The value $|\langle x, e_k \rangle|^2$ represents the energy contribution along a specific direction $e_k$, and the inequality guarantees that the sum of these contributions cannot exceed the total energy of $x$.

When the orthonormal sequence forms a complete orthonormal basis, Bessel's inequality becomes an equality known as Parseval's identity. The inequality is a crucial tool for establishing the convergence of Fourier series and other series expansions in Hilbert spaces.

== Statement of the inequality ==
Let $H$ be a Hilbert space and let $e_1, e_2, \dots$ be an orthonormal sequence in $H$. Then for any vector $x$ in $H$, Bessel's inequality states:

$$\sum_{k=1}^{\infty}\left\vert\left\langle x,e_k\right\rangle \right\vert^2 \le \left\Vert x\right\Vert^2$$

where ⟨·,·⟩ denotes the inner product in the Hilbert space $H$, and $\|\cdot\|$ denotes the norm induced by the inner product.

The terms $\langle x,e_k\rangle$ are the Fourier coefficients of $x$ with respect to the sequence $(e_k)$. The inequality implies that the series of the squared magnitudes of these coefficients converges. This allows for the definition of the vector $x'$, which is the projection of $x$ onto the subspace spanned by the orthonormal sequence:

$$x' = \sum_{k=1}^{\infty}\left\langle x,e_k\right\rangle e_k$$

Bessel's inequality guarantees that this series converges. If the sequence $(e_k)$ is a complete orthonormal basis, then $x' = x$, and the inequality becomes an equality known as Parseval's identity.

=== Proof ===
The inequality follows from the non-negativity of the norm of a vector. For any natural number $n$, let

$$x_n = \sum_{k=1}^n \langle x, e_k \rangle e_k$$

This vector $x_n$ is the projection of $x$ onto the subspace spanned by the first $n$ basis vectors. The vector $x-x_n$ is orthogonal to this subspace, and thus orthogonal to $x_n$ itself. By the Pythagorean theorem for inner product spaces, we have $\|x\|^2 = \|x_n\|^2 + \|x-x_n\|^2$. The proof proceeds by computing $\|x - x_n\|^2$:

$$\begin{align}
0 \leq \left\| x - \sum_{k=1}^n \langle x, e_k \rangle e_k\right\|^2 &= \left\langle x - \sum_{k=1}^n \langle x, e_k \rangle e_k, \; x - \sum_{j=1}^n \langle x, e_j \rangle e_j \right\rangle \\
&= \|x\|^2 - \sum_{k=1}^n \overline{\langle x, e_k \rangle} \langle x, e_k \rangle - \sum_{j=1}^n \overline{\langle x, e_j \rangle} \langle e_j, x \rangle + \sum_{k=1}^n \sum_{j=1}^n \overline{\langle x, e_k \rangle} \langle x, e_j \rangle \langle e_k, e_j \rangle \\
&= \|x\|^2 - \sum_{k=1}^n |\langle x, e_k \rangle |^2 - \sum_{j=1}^n |\langle x, e_j \rangle |^2 + \sum_{k=1}^n | \langle x, e_k \rangle |^2 \\
&= \|x\|^2 - \sum_{k=1}^n | \langle x, e_k \rangle |^2
\end{align}$$

This holds for any $n \ge 1$. Since the partial sums are non-negative and bounded above by $\|x\|^2$, the series $\sum_{k=1}^{\infty}|\langle x,e_k\rangle|^2$ converges and its sum is less than or equal to $\|x\|^2$.

== Fourier series ==
In the theory of Fourier series, in the particular case of the Fourier orthonormal system, we get if $f \colon \mathbb{R} \to \mathbb{C}$ has period $T$,

$$\sum_{k \in \mathbb{Z}} \left\vert \int_0^T e^{-2 \pi i k t/T} f (t) \,\mathrm{d}t\right\vert^2 \le T \int_0^T \vert f (t)\vert^2 \,\mathrm{d}t.$$

In the particular case where $f \colon \mathbb{R} \to \mathbb{R}$, one has then

$$\left\vert \int_0^T f (t) \,\mathrm{d}t\right\vert^2
+ 2 \sum_{n = 1}^\infty \left\vert \int_0^T \cos (2 \pi k t/T) f (t) \,\mathrm{d}t\right\vert^2
+ 2 \sum_{n = 1}^\infty \left\vert \int_0^T \sin (2 \pi k t/T) f (t) \,\mathrm{d}t\right\vert^2 \le T \int_0^T \vert f (t)\vert^2 \,\mathrm{d}t.$$

== Non countable case ==
More generally, if $H$ is a pre-Hilbert space and $(e_\alpha)_{\alpha \in A}$ is an orthonormal system, then for every $x \in H$

$$\sum_{\alpha \in A}  | \langle x, e_\alpha \rangle |^2 \le \lVert x \rVert^2$$

This is proved by noting that if $F \subseteq A$ is finite, then

$$\sum_{\alpha \in F}  | \langle x, e_\alpha \rangle |^2 \le \lVert x \rVert^2$$

and then by definition of infinite sum

$$\sum_{\alpha \in A}  | \langle x, e_\alpha \rangle |^2 = \sup \Bigl\{\sum_{\alpha \in F}  | \langle x, e_\alpha \rangle |^2 : F \subseteq A \text{ is finite}\Bigr\}
\le \lVert x \rVert^2.$$

== See also ==
- Cauchy–Schwarz inequality
- Parseval's theorem
- Rademacher–Menchov theorem
