= Phylogenetic signal =

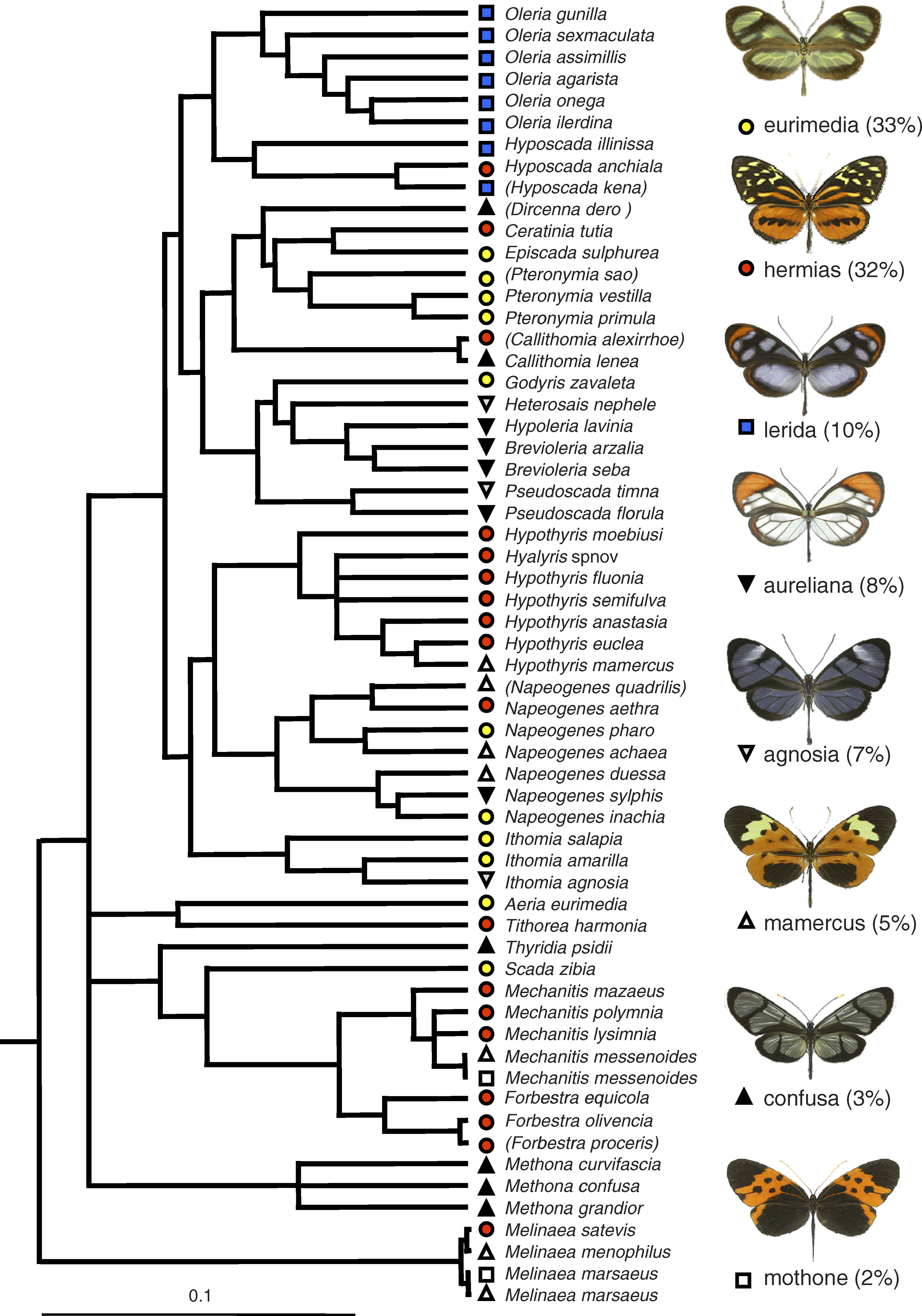
The phylogenetic tree above shows significant phylogenetic signal in the mimicry structure of the community. This display confirms closely related species share color patterns more often than expected at random.

Phylogenetic signal is an evolutionary and ecological term, that describes the tendency or the pattern of related biological species to resemble each other more than any other species that is randomly picked from the same phylogenetic tree.

== Characteristics ==
Phylogenetic signal is usually described as the tendency of related biological species to resemble each other more than any other species that is randomly picked from the same phylogenetic tree. In other words, phylogenetic signal can be defined as the statistical dependence among species' trait values that is a consequence of their phylogenetic relationships. The traits (e.g. morphological, ecological, life-history or behavioural traits) are inherited characteristics – meaning the trait values are usually alike within closely related species, while trait values of distantly related biological species do not resemble each other to a such great degree. It is often said that traits that are more similar in closely related taxa than in distant relatives exhibit greater phylogenetic signal. On the other hand, some traits are a consequence of convergent evolution and appear more similar in distantly related taxa than in relatives. Such traits show lower phylogenetic signal.

Phylogenetic signal is a measure, closely related with an evolutionary process and development of taxa. It is thought that high rate of evolution leads to low phylogenetic signal and vice versa (hence, high phylogenetic signal is usually a consequence of either low rate of evolution either stabilizing type of selection). Similarly high value of phylogenetic signal results in an existence of similar traits between closely related biological species, while increasing evolutionary distance between related species leads to decrease in similarity. With a help of phylogenetic signal we can quantify to what degree closely related biological taxa share similar traits.

On the other hand, some authors advise against such interpretations (the ones based on estimates of phylogenetic signal) of evolutionary rate and process. While studying simple models for quantitative trait evolution, such as the homogeneous rate genetic drift, it appears to be no relation between phylogenetic signal and rate of evolution. Within other models (e.g. functional constraint, fluctuating selection, phylogenetic niche conservatism, evolutionary heterogeneity etc.) relations between evolutionary rate, evolutionary process and phylogenetic signal are more complex, and can not be easily generalized using mentioned perception of the relation between two phenomenons. Some authors argue that phylogenetic signal is not always strong in each clade and for each trait. It is also not clear if all of the possible traits do exhibit phylogenetic signal and if it is measurable.

== Aim and methodology ==
=== Goal ===
Phylogenetic signal is a concept widely used in different ecological and evolutionary studies.

Among many questions that can be answered using a concept of phylogenetic signal, the most common ones are:

- To what degree are investigated traits in correlation?
- How, when and why do certain traits evolve?
- Which processes are the driving force of community assembly?
- Do niches get conserved along phylogenies?
- Is there any relation between vulnerability to climate change and taxa phylogeny?

=== Techniques ===
Quantifying phylogenetic signal can be done using a range of various methods that are used for researching biodiversity in an aspect of evolutionary relatedness. With the help of measuring phylogenetic signal one can determine exactly how studied traits are correlated with phylogenetic relationships between species.

Some of the earliest ways of quantifying phylogenetic signal were based on the use of various statistical methods (such as phylogenetic autocorrelation coefficients, phylogenetic correlograms, as well as autoregressive models). With a help of the mentioned methods one is able to quantify the value of phylogenetic autocorrelation for a studied trait throughout the phylogeny. Another method commonly used in studying phylogenetic signal is so-called Brownian diffusion model of trait evolution that is based on the Brownian motion (BM) principle. Using Brownian diffusion model, one can not only study values but also compare those measures between various phylogenies. Phylogenetic signal in continuous traits can be quantified and measured using K-statistic. Within this technique values from zero to infinity are used and higher value also means greater level of phylogenetic signal.

The table below shows the most common indices and associated tests used for analyzing phylogenetic signal.

Analyzing phylogenetic signal
Type of statistics	Approach	Based on the model?	Statistical framework/applied test	Data	Reference
Abouheif's C mean	Autocorrelation	X	Permutation	Continuous	
Blomberg's K	Evolutionary	✓	Permutation	Continuous	
D statistic	Evolutionary	✓	Permutation	Categorical	
Moran's I	Autocorrelation	X	Permutation	Continuous	
Pagel's λ	Evolutionary	✓	Maximum likelihood	Continuous	
δstatistic	Evolutionary	✓	Bayesian	Categorical	

== See also ==
- Phylogenetic niche conservatism
- Phylogenetic comparative methods
