= Dynamic functional connectivity =

Dynamic functional connectivity (DFC) refers to the observed phenomenon that functional connectivity changes over a short time. Dynamic functional connectivity is a recent expansion on traditional functional connectivity analysis which typically assumes that functional networks are static in time. DFC is related to a variety of different neurological disorders, and has been suggested to be a more accurate representation of functional brain networks. The primary tool for analyzing DFC is fMRI, but DFC has also been observed with several other mediums. DFC is a recent development within the field of functional neuroimaging whose discovery was motivated by the observation of temporal variability in the rising field of steady state connectivity research.

== Overview and history ==
=== Static connectivity ===
Functional connectivity refers to the functionally integrated relationship between spatially separated brain regions. Unlike structural connectivity which looks for physical connections in the brain, functional connectivity is related to similar patterns of activation in different brain regions regardless of the apparent physical connectedness of the regions. This type of connectivity was discovered in the mid-1990s and has been seen primarily using fMRI and Positron emission tomography. Functional connectivity is usually measured during resting state fMRI and is typically analyzed in terms of correlation, coherence, and spatial grouping based on temporal similarities. These methods have been used to show that functional connectivity is related to behavior in a variety of different tasks, and that it has a neural basis. These methods assume the functional connections in the brain remain constant in a short time over a task or period of data collection.

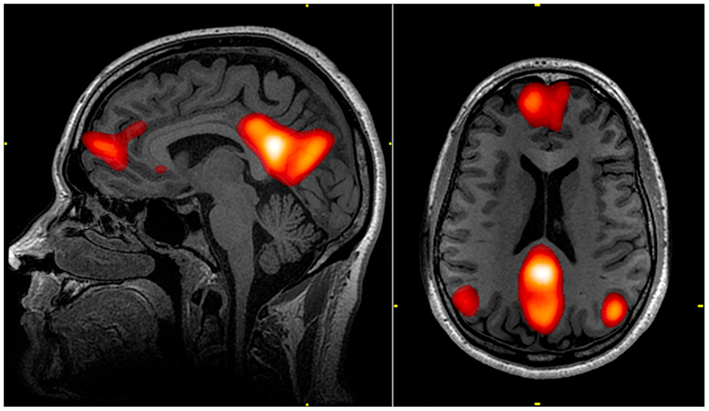
The default mode network above is one example of a brain network seen using steady state connectivity. This network is fairly stable in time, but it has been shown to have a variable relationship with other networks, and to vary slightly in its own characteristics in time.

=== The origin of dynamic analysis ===
Studies that showed brain state dependent changes in functional connectivity were the first indicators that temporal variation in functional connectivity may be significant. Several studies in the mid-2000s examined the changes in FC that were related to a variety of different causes such as mental tasks, sleep, and learning. These changes often occur within the same individual and are clearly relevant to behavior. DFC has now been investigated in a variety of different contexts with many analysis tools. It has been shown to be related to both behavior and neural activity. Some researchers believe that it may be heavily related to high level thought or consciousness.

=== Significant findings from DFC ===
Because DFC is such a new field, much of the research related to it is conducted to validate the relevance of these dynamic changes rather than explore their implications; however, many critical findings have been made that help the scientific community better understand the brain. Analysis of dynamic functional connectivity has shown that far from being completely static, the functional networks of the brain fluctuate on the scale of seconds to minutes. These changes are generally seen as movements from one short term state to another, rather than continuous shifts. Many studies have shown reproducible patterns of network activity that move throughout the brain. These patterns have been seen in both animals and humans, and are present at only certain points during a scanner session. In addition to showing transient brain states, DFC analysis has shown a distinct hierarchical organization of the networks of the brain. Connectivity between bilaterally symmetric regions is the most stable form of connectivity in the brain, followed by other regions with direct anatomical connections. Steady state functional connectivity networks exist and have physiological relevance, but have less temporal stability than the anatomical networks. Finally, some functional networks are fleeting enough to only be seen with DFC analysis. These networks also possess physiological relevance but are much less temporally stable than the other networks in the brain.

== Methods of analysis ==
=== Sliding window ===
Sliding window analysis is the most common method used in the analysis of functional connectivity, first introduced by Sakoglu and Calhoun in 2009, and applied to schizophrenia. Sliding window analysis is performed by conducting analysis on a set number of scans in an fMRI session. The number of scans is the length of the sliding window. The defined window is then moved a certain number of scans forward in time and additional analysis is performed. The movement of the window is usually referenced in terms of the degree of overlap between adjacent windows. One of the principle benefits of sliding window analysis is that almost any steady state analysis can also be performed using sliding window if the window length is sufficiently large. Sliding window analysis also has a benefit of being easy to understand and in some ways easier to interpret. As the most common method of analysis, sliding window analysis has been used in many different ways to investigate a variety of different characteristics and implications of DFC. In order to be accurately interpreted, data from sliding window analysis generally must be compared between two different groups. Researchers have used this type of analysis to show different DFC characteristics in diseased and healthy patients, high and low performers on cognitive tasks, and between large scale brain states.

=== Activation patterns ===
One of the first methods ever used to analyze DFC was pattern analysis of fMRI images to show that there are patterns of activation in spatially separated brain regions that tend to have synchronous activity. It has become clear that there is a spatial and temporal periodicity in the brain that probably reflects some of the constant processes of the brain. Repeating patterns of network information have been suggested to account for 25–50% of the variance in fMRI BOLD data. These patterns of activity have primarily been seen in rats as a propagating wave of synchronized activity along the cortex. These waves have also been shown to be related to underlying neural activity, and has been shown to be present in humans as well as rats.

=== Point process analysis ===
Departing from the traditional approaches, recently an efficient method was introduced to analyze rapidly changing functional activations patterns which transforms the fMRI BOLD data into a point process. This is achieved by selecting for each voxel the points of inflection of the BOLD signal (i.e., the peaks). These few points contain a great portion of the information pertaining functional connectivity, because it has been demonstrated, that despite the tremendous reduction on the data size (> 95%), it compares very well with inferences of functional connectivity obtained with standard methods which uses the full signal.

The large information content of these few points is consistent with the results of Petridou et al. who demonstrated he contribution of these "spontaneous events" to the correlation strength and power spectra of the slow spontaneous fluctuations by deconvolving the task hemodynamic response function from the rest data. Subsequently, similar principles were successfully applied under the name of co-activation patterns (CAP).

=== Other methods ===
Time-frequency analysis has been proposed as an analysis method that is capable of overcoming many of the challenges associated with sliding windows. Unlike sliding window analysis, time frequency analysis allows the researcher to investigate both frequency and amplitude information simultaneously. The wavelet transform has been used to conduct DFC analysis that has validated the existence of DFC by showing its significant changes in time. This same method has recently been used to investigate some of the dynamic characteristics of accepted networks. For example, time frequency analysis has shown that the anticorrelation between the default mode network and the task-positive network is not constant in time but rather is a temporary state. Independent component analysis has become one of the most common methods of network generation in steady state functional connectivity. ICA divides fMRI signal into several spatial components that have similar temporal patterns. More recently, ICA has been used to divide fMRI data into different temporal components. This has been termed temporal ICA and it has been used to plot network behavior that accounts for 25% of variability in the correlation of anatomical nodes in fMRI.

== Controversy and limitations ==
Several researchers have argued that DFC may be a simple reflection of analysis, scanner, or physiological noise. Noise in fMRI can arise from a variety of different factors including heart beat, changes in the blood brain barrier, characteristics of the acquiring scanner, or unintended effects of analysis. Some researchers have proposed that the variability in functional connectivity in fMRI studies is consistent with the variability that one would expect from simply analyzing random data. This complaint that DFC may reflect only noise has been recently lessened by the observation of electrical basis to fMRI DFC data and behavioral relevance of DFC characteristics.

In addition to complaints that DFC may be a product of scanner noise, observed DFC could be criticized based on the indirect nature of fMRI which is used to observe it. fMRI data is collected by quickly acquiring a sequence of MRI images in time using echo planar imaging. The contrast in these images is heavily influenced by the ratio of oxygenated and deoxygenated blood. Since active neurons require more energy than resting neurons, changes in this contrast is traditionally interpreted an indirect measure of neural activity. Because of its indirect nature, fMRI data in DFC studies could be criticized as potentially being a reflection of non neural information. This concern has been alleviated recently by the observed correlation between fMRI DFC and simultaneously acquired electrophysiology data. Battaglia and colleagues have tried to address those controversies, linking dynamic functional connectivity to causality or effective connectivity. The scientists claim indeed that dynamic effective connectivity can emerge from transitions in the collective organization of coherent neural activity.

== Physiological evidence ==
fMRI is the primary means of investigating DFC. This presents unique challenges because fMRI has fairly low temporal resolution, typically 0.5 Hz, and is only an indirect measure of neural activity. The indirect nature of fMRI analysis suggests that validation is needed to show that findings from fMRI are actually relevant and reflective of neural activity.

=== Multi modal approach ===
==== Electrophysiology ====
Correlation between DFC and electrophysiology has led some scientists to suggest that DFC could reflect hemodynamic results of dynamic network behavior that has been seen in single cell analysis of neuron populations. Although hemodynamic response is too slow to reflect a one-to-one correspondence with neural network dynamics, it is plausible that DFC is a reflection of the power of some frequencies of electrophysiology data.

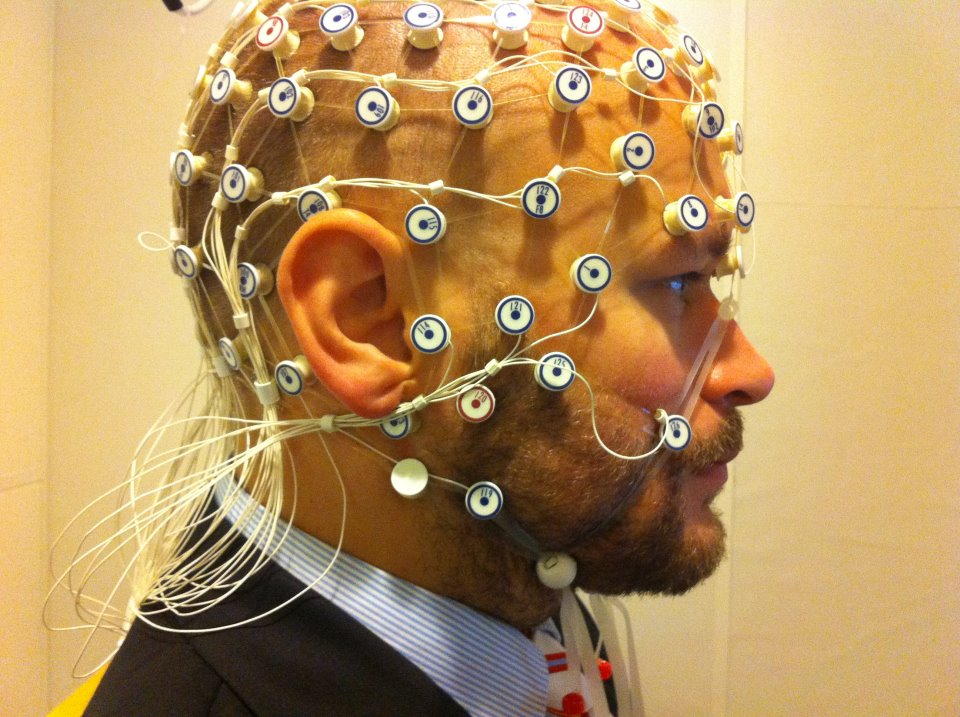
Full EEG caps like the one above are often used simultaneously with fMRI in order to capture information about the electrical signals underlying the BOLD signal.

Electroencephalography (EEG) has also been used in humans to both validate and interpret observations made in DFC. EEG has poor spatial resolution because it is only able to acquire data on the surface of the scalp, but it is reflective of broad electrical activity from many neurons. EEG has been used simultaneously with fMRI to account for some of the inter scan variance in FC. EEG has also been used to show that changes in FC are related to broad brain states observed in EEG.

==== MEG ====
Magnetoencephalography (MEG) can be used to measure the magnetic fields produced by electrical activity in the brain. MEG has high temporal resolution and has generally higher spatial resolution than EEG. Resting state studies with MEG are still limited by spatial resolution, but the modality has been used to show that resting state networks move through periods of low and high levels of correlation. This observation is consistent with the results seen in other DFC studies such as DFC activation pattern analysis.

=== Neuronal mechanisms ===
Single-unit recording were used in order to explore the extent, strength and plasticity of functional connectivity between individual cortical neurons in cats and monkeys. Such studies revealed correlated activity at various time scales. At the fastest time scale, that of 1 – 20 ms, correlation coefficients were typically < 0.05. These functional connections were found to be plastic – changing the correlation for a conditioning period of Ts (typically a few minutes), by means of spike-triggered sensory stimulations, induced short-term (typically < Ts) lasting changes of the connections. The pre-post conditioning strengthening of a functional connection was typically equal to the square root of its pre-during conditioning strengthening.

Dynamic Functional Connectivity studied using fMRI may be related to a phenomenon previously discovered in macaque prefrontal cortex termed Dynamic Network Connectivity, whereby arousal mechanisms rapidly alter the strength of glutamate synaptic connections onto dendritic spines by opening or closing potassium channels on spines, thus weakening or strengthening connectivity, respectively. For example, dopamine D1 receptor and/or noradrenergic beta-1 receptor stimulation on spines can increase cAMP-PKA-calcium signaling to open HCN, KCNQ2, and/or SK channels to rapidly weaken a connection, e.g. as occurs during stress.

=== Behavioral basis ===
DFC has been shown to be significantly related to human performance, including vigilance and aspects of attention. It has been proposed and supported that the network behavior immediately prior to a task onset is a strong predictor of performance on that task. Traditionally, fMRI studies have focused on the magnitude of activation in brain regions as a predictor of performance, but recent research has shown that correlation between networks as measured with sliding window analysis is an even stronger predictor of performance. Individual differences in functional connectivity variability (FCV) across sliding windows within fMRI scans have been shown to correlate with the tendency to attend to pain. The degree to which a subject is mind wandering away from a sensory stimulus has also been related to FCV.

== Clinical relevance ==
One of the principal motivations of DFC analysis is to better understand, detect and treat neurological diseases. Static functional connectivity has been shown to be significantly related to a variety of diseases such as depression, schizophrenia, and Alzheimer's disease. Because of the newness of the field, DFC has only recently been used to investigate disease states, but since 2012 each of these three diseases has been shown to be correlated to dynamic temporal characteristics in functional connectivity. Most of these differences are related to the amount of time that is spent in different transient states. Patients with Schizophrenia have less frequent state changes than healthy patients, and this result has led to the suggestion that the disease is related to patients being stuck in certain brain states where the brain is unable to respond quickly to different queues. Also, a study in the visual sensory network showed that schizophrenia subjects spent more time than the healthy subjects in a state in which the connectivity between the middle temporal gyrus and other regions of the visual sensory network is highly negative. Studies with Alzheimer's disease have shown that patients with this ailment have altered network connectivity as well as altered time spent in the networks that are present. The observed correlation between DFC and disease does not imply that the changes in DFC are the cause of any of these diseases, but information from DFC analysis may be used to better understand the effects of the disease and to more quickly and accurately diagnose them.
