= Peter D. Welch =

American scientist and researcher

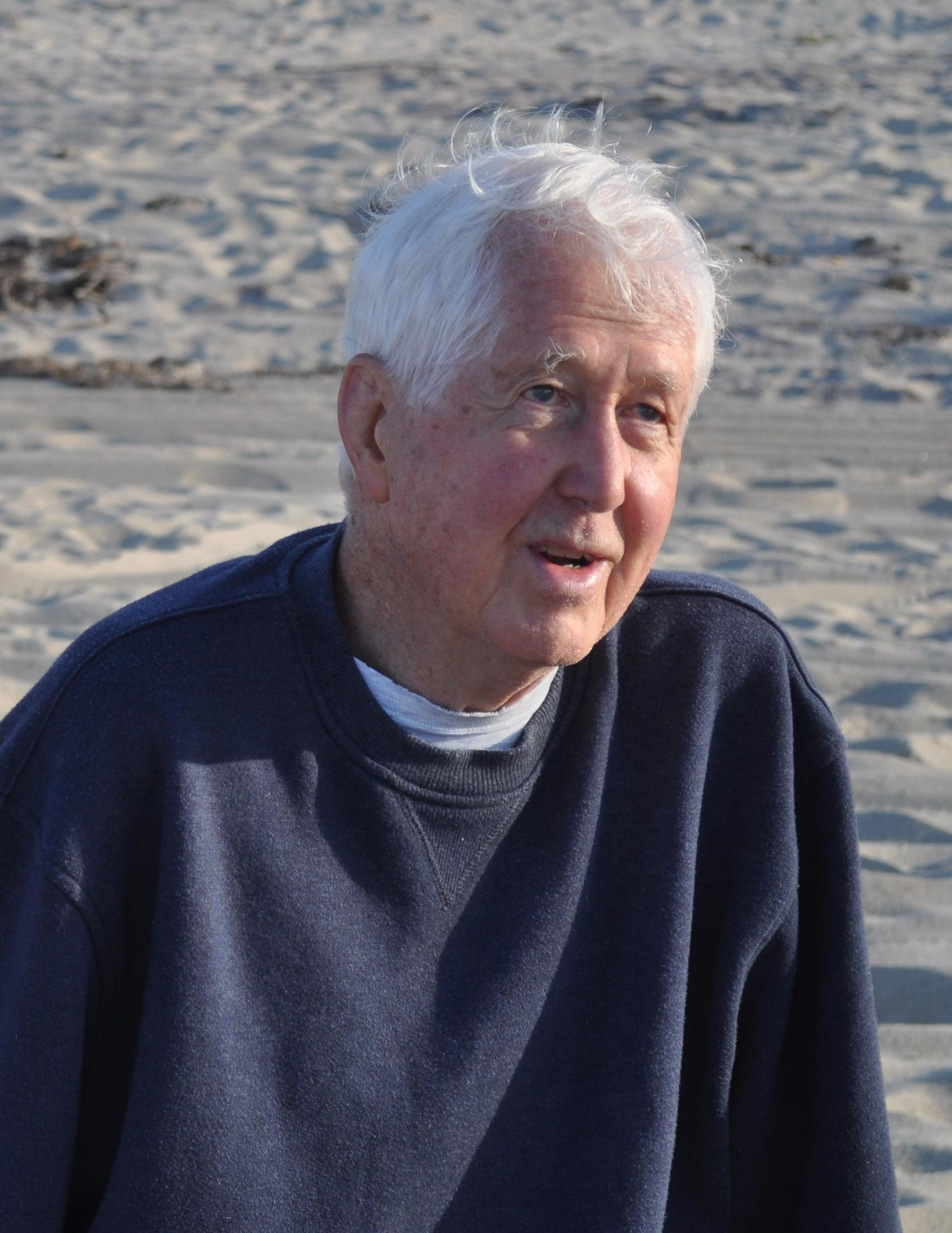
- Peter D. Welch (2012)
- Education: University of Wisconsin (M.S. in Mathematics); New Mexico State University (M.S. in Physics); Columbia University (Ph.D. in mathematical statistics)
- Occupations: Scientist and researcher

Peter D. Welch (1929-2023) was a scientist and researcher in the area of computer simulation, as well as applied mathematics, applied statistics, and computer science. A former IBM researcher, he is best known for his work with Welch's method to reduce signal noise.

== Education ==
Welch attended University of Chicago. He received his M.S. in Mathematics from the University of Wisconsin (1951), M.S. in Physics from New Mexico State University (1956) and Ph.D. in mathematical statistics from Columbia University (1963).

== Career ==
Welch joined IBM Research at the Thomas J. Watson Research Center in Yorktown Heights, New York, where he conducted research and development for over three decades. At IBM Research he worked in the areas of speech recognition, spectral estimation, queueing theory, seismic signal processing, fast Fourier methodology, pattern recognition, computer and communication system performance modeling, simulation output analysis, and graphics system design.

Welch played a role in promoting simulation as a rigorous discipline during his service as the Simulation Department Area Editor of Operations Research (1983-1987). Welch's paper on the "use of fast Fourier transform for the estimation of power spectra" or Welch's method, has been cited over 5,000 times and remains widely used to reduce noise caused by imperfect and finite data.

Welch died in 2023, at the age of 94.

== Awards ==
Welch received the Institute for Operations Research and Management Sciences (INFORMS) Simulation Society "Distinguished Service Award" in 2010 and its "Lifetime Professional Achievement Award" in 2013. The INFORMS Lifetime Professional Achievement Award cites Welch's 62-year career marked by "contributions of fundamental importance not only in the field of computer simulation but also in the broader fields of applied mathematics, applied statistics, computer science." Since the mid-1970s, states INFORMS, "Peter has made groundbreaking contributions to the theory and practice of computer simulation, to the dissemination of knowledge in that field, and to the development of simulation-related software systems."
