= Phylogenetic niche conservatism =

Tendency of lineage to retain ancestral traits

The term phylogenetic niche conservatism has seen increasing use in recent years in the scientific literature, though the exact definition has been a matter of some contention. Fundamentally, phylogenetic niche conservatism refers to the tendency of species to retain their ancestral traits. When defined as such, phylogenetic niche conservatism is therefore nearly synonymous with phylogenetic signal. The point of contention is whether or not "conservatism" refers simply to the tendency of species to resemble their ancestors, or implies that "closely related species are more similar than expected based on phylogenetic relationships". If the latter interpretation is employed, then phylogenetic niche conservatism can be seen as an extreme case of phylogenetic signal, and implies that the processes which prevent divergence are in operation in the lineage under consideration. Despite efforts by Jonathan Losos to end this habit, however, the former interpretation appears to frequently motivate scientific research. In this case, phylogenetic niche conservatism might best be considered a form of phylogenetic signal reserved for traits with broad-scale ecological ramifications (i.e. related to the Hutchinsonian niche). Thus, phylogenetic niche conservatism is usually invoked with regard to closely related species occurring in similar environments.

== History and debate ==
According to a recent review, the term niche conservatism traces its roots to a book on comparative methods in evolutionary biology. However, and as these authors also note, the idea is much older. For instance, Darwin observed in the Origin of Species that species in the same genus tend to resemble one another. This was not a matter of chance, as the entire Linnean taxonomy system is based on classifying species into hierarchically nested groups, e.g. a genus is (and was particularly at the time of Darwin's writing) by definition a collection of similar species. In modern times this pattern has come to be referred to as phylogenetic signal, "the tendency of related species to resemble each other more than species drawn at random from the same tree ". Methods such as Abouheif's C, Pagel's lambda, Blomberg's K, and Moran's I have been employed to test the statistical significance of the pattern. With regard to the term phylogenetic niche conservatism, many authors have taken a significant result here—i.e. that phylogenetic information can help "predict" species traits—to be evidence of phylogenetic niche conservatism. Other authors, however, advocate that such a pattern should be expected (i.e. follow from "Descent with modification") and, accordingly, only in instances where species resemble each other more than expected based on their phylogenetic relationships should one invoke the term phylogenetic niche conservatism. To take a single statistical test as an example, an unconstrained Brownian motion evolution process will result in a Blomberg's K value of 1; the strict school of thought would only accept a K > 1 as evidence of phylogenetic niche conservatism.

== Research foci ==
In an influential paper, Wiens and Donoghue laid out how phylogenetic niche conservatism might help explain the latitudinal diversity gradient. While support for the hypothesis that niche conservatism drives latitudinally structured variation in species richness has been found in some clades, overall, phylogenetic niche conservatism has not received strong support as the underlying cause responsible for variation in how many species occur in a given habitat. It has, however, found considerable support as a factor driving which species occur in a given habitat. That is, the study of phylogenetic niche conservatism by itself has not put an end to long-standing debate over what drives the latitudinal diversity gradient across clades, but within specific clades and across specific environmental gradients (as opposed to latitude sensu stricto), it has found support as a factor influencing which lineages are able to persist.

== See also ==
- Cladistics
- Ecological niche
- Niche differentiation
- Phylogenetic signal
