= Parseval's identity =

Result in Fourier analysis

In mathematical analysis, Parseval's identity, named after Marc-Antoine Parseval, is a fundamental result on the summability of the Fourier series of a function. The identity asserts the equality of the energy of a periodic signal (given as the integral of the squared amplitude of the signal) and the energy of its frequency domain representation (given as the sum of squares of the amplitudes). Geometrically, it is a generalized Pythagorean theorem for inner-product spaces (which can have an uncountable infinity of basis vectors).

The identity asserts that the sum of squares of the Fourier coefficients of a function is equal to the integral of the square of the function,
$$\Vert f \Vert^2_{L^2(-\pi,\pi)} = \frac1{2\pi}\int_{-\pi}^\pi |f(x)|^2 \, dx = \sum_{n=-\infty}^\infty |\hat f(n)|^2,$$
where the Fourier coefficients $\hat f(n)$ of $f$ are given by
$$\hat f(n) = \frac{1}{2\pi} \int_{-\pi}^{\pi} f(x) e^{-inx} \, dx.$$

The result holds as stated, provided $f$ is a square-integrable function or, more generally, in L^{p} space $L^2[-\pi, \pi].$ A similar result is the Plancherel theorem, which asserts that the integral of the square of the Fourier transform of a function is equal to the integral of the square of the function itself. In one-dimension, for $f \in L^2(\R),$
$$\int_{-\infty}^\infty |\hat{f}(\xi)|^2 \,d\xi = \int_{-\infty}^\infty |f(x)|^2 \,dx.$$

== Generalization of the Pythagorean theorem ==
The identity is related to the Pythagorean theorem in the more general setting of a separable Hilbert space as follows. Suppose that $H$ is a Hilbert space with inner product $\langle \,\cdot\,, \,\cdot\, \rangle.$ Let $\left(e_n\right)$ be an orthonormal basis of $H$; i.e., the linear span of the $e_n$ is dense in $H,$ and the $e_n$ are mutually orthonormal:

$$\langle e_m, e_n\rangle = \begin{cases}
1 & \mbox{if}~ m = n \\
0 & \mbox{if}~ m \neq n.
\end{cases}$$

Then Parseval's identity asserts that for every $x \in H,$
$$\sum_n \left|\left\langle x, e_n \right\rangle\right|^2 = \|x\|^2.$$

This is directly analogous to the Pythagorean theorem in Euclidean geometry, which asserts that the sum of the squares of the components of a vector in an orthonormal basis is equal to the squared length of the vector. One can recover the Fourier series version of Parseval's identity by letting $H$ be the Hilbert space $L^2[-\pi, \pi],$ and setting $e_n = e^{i n x}$ for $n \in \Z.$

More generally, Parseval's identity holds for arbitrary Hilbert spaces, not necessarily separable. When the Hilbert space is not separable any orthonormal basis is uncountable and we need to generalize the concept of a series to an unconditional sum as follows: let $\{e_r\}_{r\in \Gamma}$ an orthonormal basis of a Hilbert space (where $\Gamma$ have arbitrary cardinality), then we say that $\sum_{r\in \Gamma} a_r e_r$ converges unconditionally if for every $\epsilon>0$ there exists a finite subset $A\subset \Gamma$ such that
$$\left\| \sum_{r\in B}a_re_r-\sum_{r\in C}a_r e_r\right\|<\epsilon$$
for any pair of finite subsets $B,C\subset\Gamma$ that contains $A$ (that is, such that $A\subset B\cap C$). Note that in this case we are using a net to define the unconditional sum.

== See also ==
- Parseval's theorem – Theorem in mathematics
- Bessel's inequality – Theorem on orthonormal sequences
