= Energy (signal processing) =

Concept in signal processing

In signal processing, the energy $E_s$ of a continuous-time signal x(t) is defined as the area under the squared magnitude of the considered signal i.e., mathematically

$E_{s} \ \ = \ \ \langle x(t), x(t)\rangle \ \ = \int_{-\infty}^{\infty}{|x(t)|^2}dt$
The units of $E_s \,$will be $\left( \left[ \text{units of} \ x(t) \right] ^2 \cdot \text{s} \right)$.

And the energy $E_s$ of a discrete-time signal x(n) is defined mathematically as

$$E_{s} \ \ = \ \ \langle x(n), x(n)\rangle \ \  =  \sum_{n=-\infty}^{\infty}{|x(n)|^2}$$

== Relationship to energy in physics ==
Energy in this context is not, strictly speaking, the same as the conventional notion of energy in physics and the other sciences. The two concepts are, however, closely related, and it is possible to convert from one to the other:

$$E = {E_s \over Z} = { 1 \over Z } \int_{-\infty}^{\infty}{|x(t)|^2}dt$$
where Z represents the magnitude, in appropriate units of measure, of the load driven by the signal.

For example, if x(t) represents the potential (in volts) of an electrical signal propagating across a transmission line, then Z would represent the characteristic impedance (in ohms) of the transmission line. The units of measure for the signal energy $E_s$ would appear as volt^{2}·seconds, which is not dimensionally correct for energy in the sense of the physical sciences. After dividing $E_s$ by Z, however, the dimensions of E would become volt^{2}·seconds per ohm,

$\frac{\rm{V}^2}{\rm{\Omega}} \rm{s} = \rm{W} \rm{s} = \rm{J}$

which is equivalent to joules, the SI unit for energy as defined in the physical sciences.

== Spectral energy density ==
Similarly, the spectral energy density of signal x(t) is

$$\ E_s(f) = |X(f)|^2$$

where X(f) is the Fourier transform of x(t).

For example, if x(t) represents the magnitude of the electric field component (in volts per meter) of an optical signal propagating through free space, then the dimensions of X(f) would become volt·seconds per meter and $E_s(f)$ would represent the signal's spectral energy density (in volts^{2}·second^{2} per meter^{2}) as a function of frequency f (in hertz). Again, these units of measure are not dimensionally correct in the true sense of energy density as defined in physics. Dividing $E_s(f)$ by Z_{o}, the characteristic impedance of free space (in ohms), the dimensions become joule-seconds per meter^{2} or, equivalently, joules per meter^{2} per hertz, which is dimensionally correct in SI units for spectral energy density.

== Parseval's theorem ==
As a consequence of Parseval's theorem, one can prove that the signal energy is always equal to the summation across all frequency components of the signal's spectral energy density.

== See also ==
- Signal processing
- Parseval's theorem
- Spectral density
- Inner product
