= Bispectrum =

Statistic used for nonlinear interactions

In mathematics, in the area of statistical analysis, the bispectrum is a statistic used to search for nonlinear interactions. It is the third-order Polyspectrum.

== Definition ==
Ignoring the requirements for existence of this Polyspectrum, the bispectrum or bispectral density is the Fourier transform of C_{3}(t_{1}, t_{2}) (third-order cumulant-generating function).

=== Related Definitions ===
The Fourier transform of the second-order cumulant, i.e., the autocorrelation function, is the traditional power spectrum.

Generalizations of power spectrum and bispectrum to higher orders are known as higher order spectra or polyspectra.

== Applications ==
Bispectrum and bicoherence may be applied to the case of non-linear interactions of a continuous spectrum of propagating waves in one dimension.

Bispectral measurements have been carried out for EEG signals monitoring. It was also shown that bispectra characterize differences between families of musical instruments.

In seismology, signals rarely have adequate duration for making sensible bispectral estimates from time averages.

Bispectral analysis describes observations made at two wavelengths. It is often used by scientists to analyze elemental makeup of a planetary atmosphere by analyzing the amount of light reflected and received through various color filters. By combining and removing two filters, much can be gleaned from only two filters. Through modern computerized interpolation, a third virtual filter can be created to recreate true color photographs that, while not particularly useful for scientific analysis, are popular for public display in textbooks and fund raising campaigns.

Bispectral analysis can also be used to analyze interactions between wave patterns and tides on Earth.

A form of bispectral analysis called the bispectral index is applied to EEG waveforms to monitor depth of anesthesia.

Biphase (phase of polyspectrum, cmp. polyspectra) can be used for detection of phase couplings, noise reduction of polharmonic (particularly, speech) signal analysis.

== A physical interpretation ==
The bispectrum reflects the energy budget of interactions, as it can be interpreted as a covariance defined between energy-supplying and energy-receiving parties of waves involved in an nonlinear interaction. On the other hand, bicoherence has been proven to be the corresponding correlation coefficient. Just as correlation cannot sufficiently demonstrate the presence of causality, spectrum and bicoherence also cannot sufficiently substantiate the existence of a nonlinear interaction.

== Generalizations ==
Bispectra fall in the category of higher-order spectra, or polyspectra and provide supplementary information to the power spectrum. The third order polyspectrum (bispectrum) is the easiest to compute, and hence the most popular.

A statistic defined analogously is the bispectral coherency or bicoherence.

=== Trispectrum ===
The Fourier transform of C4 (t1, t2, t3) (fourth-order cumulant-generating function) is called the trispectrum or trispectral density.

The trispectrum T(f1,f2,f3) falls into the category of higher-order spectra, or polyspectra, and provides supplementary information to the power spectrum. The trispectrum is a three-dimensional construct. The symmetries of the trispectrum allow a much reduced support set to be defined, contained within the following vertices, where 1 is the Nyquist frequency. (0,0,0) (1/2,1/2,-1/2) (1/3,1/3,0) (1/2,0,0) (1/4,1/4,1/4). The plane containing the points (1/6,1/6,1/6) (1/4,1/4,0) (1/2,0,0) divides this volume into an inner and an outer region. A stationary signal will have zero strength (statistically) in the outer region. The trispectrum support is divided into regions by the plane identified above and by the (f1,f2) plane. Each region has different requirements in terms of the bandwidth of signal required for non-zero values.

In the same way that the bispectrum identifies contributions to a signal's skewness as a function of frequency triples, the trispectrum identifies contributions to a signal's kurtosis as a function of frequency quadruplets.

The trispectrum has been used to investigate the domains of applicability of maximum kurtosis phase estimation used in the deconvolution of seismic data to find layer structure.
