= Rosières-aux-Salines =

- Commune
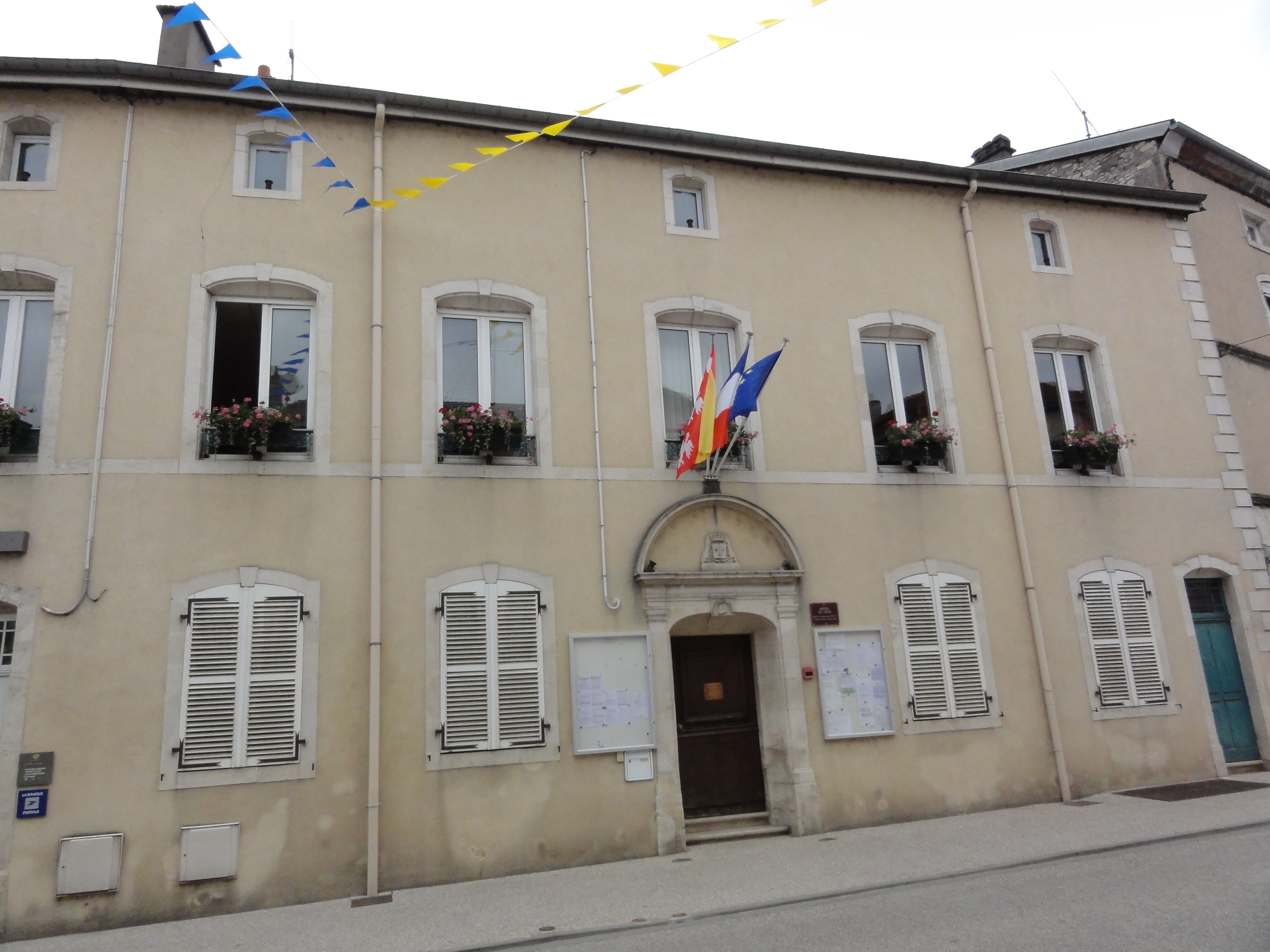
- The town hall in Rosières-aux-Salines

- Coat of arms
- Location of Rosières-aux-Salines
- Location within France Location within Grand Est
- Coordinates: 48°35′34″N 6°20′03″E
- Country: France
- Region: Grand Est
- Department: Meurthe-et-Moselle
- Arrondissement: Nancy
- Canton: Lunéville-2
- Intercommunality: CC Pays du Sel et du Vermois

Government
  - Mayor (2020–2026): Philippe Jonquet
- Area^{1}: 26.95 km^{2} (10.41 sq mi)
- Elevation: 211 m (692 ft)
- Highest elevation: 336 m (1,102 ft)
- Lowest elevation: 202 m (663 ft)
- Population (2023): 2,810
  - Density: 104/km^{2} (270/sq mi)
- Demonym: Rosiérois
- Time zone: UTC+01:00 (CET)
  - Summer (DST): UTC+02:00 (CEST)
- INSEE/Postal code: 54462 /54110
- ^{1} French Land Register data, which excludes lakes, ponds, glaciers > 1 km^{2} (0.386 sq mi or 247 acres) and river estuaries.

Rosières-aux-Salines (French pronunciation: [ʁozjɛʁ o salin]) is a commune in the Meurthe-et-Moselle département in north-eastern France.

In the past, inhabitants of Rosières-aux-Salines were insultingly known by their neighbours as oua-oua (pronounced "wa-wa"), on account of a speech defect caused by a local thyroid condition, which was considered hilarious.

== Population ==
Historical population
Year	Pop.	±% p.a.
1968	2,584	—
1975	2,604	+0.11%
1982	2,830	+1.20%
1990	2,946	+0.50%
1999	2,839	−0.41%
2007	2,830	−0.04%
2012	2,874	+0.31%
2017	2,858	−0.11%
2023	2,810	−0.28%
Source: INSEE

== See also ==
- Communes of the Meurthe-et-Moselle department
