= Ergodic process =

Concept in statistics

In physics, statistics, econometrics and signal processing, a stochastic process is said to be in an ergodic regime if an observable's ensemble average equals the time average. In this regime, any collection of random samples from a process must represent the average statistical properties of the entire regime. A regime implies a time-window of a process whereby ergodicity measure is applied.

== Specific definitions ==
A wide-sense stationary process $X(t)$ has constant mean

$$\mu_X= E[X(t)],$$

and autocovariance

$$r_X(\tau) = E[(X(t)-\mu_X) (X(t+\tau)-\mu_X)],$$

that depends only on the lag $\tau$ and not on time $t$. The properties $\mu_X$ and $r_X(\tau)$ are ensemble averages (calculated over all possible sample functions $X$), not time averages.

The process $X(t)$ is said to be mean-ergodic or mean-square ergodic in the first moment if the time average estimate

$$\hat{\mu}_X = \frac{1}{T} \int_{0}^{T} X(t) \, dt$$

converges in squared mean to the ensemble average $\mu_X$ as $T \rightarrow \infty$.

Likewise, the process is said to be autocovariance-ergodic or d moment if the time average estimate

$$\hat{r}_X(\tau) = \frac{1}{T} \int_0^T [X(t+\tau)-\mu_X] [X(t)-\mu_X] \, dt$$

converges in squared mean to the ensemble average $r_X(\tau)$, as $T \rightarrow \infty$. A process which is ergodic in the mean and autocovariance is sometimes called ergodic in the wide sense.

== Discrete-time random processes ==
The notion of ergodicity also applies to discrete-time random processes $X[n]$ for integer $n$.

A discrete-time random process $X[n]$ is ergodic in mean if

$$\hat{\mu}_X = \frac{1}{N} \sum_{n=1}^{N} X[n]$$

converges in squared mean to the ensemble average $E[X]$, as $N \rightarrow \infty$.

== Examples ==
Ergodicity means the ensemble average equals the time average. The following are examples to illustrate this principle.

=== Call centre ===
Each operator in a call centre spends time alternately speaking and listening on the telephone, as well as taking breaks between calls. Each break and each call are of different length, as are the durations of each 'burst' of speaking and listening, and indeed so is the rapidity of speech at any given moment, which could each be modelled as a random process.

- Take N call centre operators (N should be a very large integer) and plot the number of words spoken per minute for each operator over a long period (several shifts). For each operator you will have a series of points, which could be joined with lines to create a 'waveform'.
- Calculate the average value of those points in the waveform; this gives you the time average.
- There are N waveforms and N operators. These N waveforms are known as an ensemble.
- Now take a particular instant of time in all those waveforms and find the average value of the number of words spoken per minute. That gives you the ensemble average for that instant.
- If ensemble average always equals time average, then the system is ergodic.

=== Electronics ===
Each resistor has an associated thermal noise that depends on the temperature. Take N resistors (N should be very large) and plot the voltage across those resistors for a long period. For each resistor you will have a waveform. Calculate the average value of that waveform; this gives you the time average. There are N waveforms as there are N resistors. These N plots are known as an ensemble. Now take a particular instant of time in all those plots and find the average value of the voltage. That gives you the ensemble average for all plot. If ensemble average and time average are the same then it is ergodic.

== Examples of non-ergodic random processes ==
- An unbiased random walk is non-ergodic. Its expectation value is zero at all times, whereas its time average is a random variable with divergent variance.
- Suppose that we have two coins: one coin is fair and the other has two heads. We choose (at random) one of the coins first, and then perform a sequence of independent tosses of our selected coin. Let X[n] denote the outcome of the nth toss, with 1 for heads and 0 for tails. Then the ensemble average is 1/2 (1/2 + 1) = 3/4; yet the long-term average is 1/2 for the fair coin and 1 for the two-headed coin. So the long term time-average is either 1/2 or 1. Hence, this random process is not ergodic in mean.

== See also ==
- Ergodic hypothesis
- Ergodicity
- Ergodic theory, a branch of mathematics concerned with a more general formulation of ergodicity
- Loschmidt's paradox
- Poincaré recurrence theorem
