= K-statistic =

In statistics, a k-statistic is a minimum-variance unbiased estimator of a cumulant. K-statistics find application in signal processing for the unbiased estimation of polyspectra.
