= Slepian function =

Mathematical function

Slepian functions are a class of spatio-spectrally concentrated functions that form an orthogonal basis for bandlimited or spacelimited spaces. That is, they are concentrated in space or time while spectrally bandlimited, or concentrated in spectral band while space- or time-limited. They are widely used as basis functions for constructive approximation and in linear inverse problems, and as apodization tapers or window functions in quadratic problems of spectral density estimation.

Slepian function constructions exist in discrete (regular and irregular) and continuous varieties, in one, two, and three dimensions, in Cartesian and spherical geometry, on surfaces and in volumes, on graphs, and in scalar, vector, and tensor forms.

== General setting and operator formalism ==
Without reference to any of these particularities, let $f$ be a square-integrable function of physical space, and let $\mathcal{H}$ represent Fourier transformation, such that $F=\mathcal{H}f$ and $\mathcal{H}^{-1}F=f$. Let the operators $\mathcal{R}$ and $\mathcal{L}$ project onto the space of spacelimited functions, $\mathcal{S}_R$, and the space of bandlimited functions, $\mathcal{S}_L$, respectively, whereby $R$ is an arbitrary nontrivial subregion of all of physical space, and $L$ an arbitrary nontrivial subregion of spectral space. Thus, the operator $\mathcal{R}$ acts to spacelimit, and the operator $\mathcal{H}^{-1}\mathcal{L}\mathcal{H}$ acts to bandlimit the function $f$.

Slepian's quadratic spectral concentration problem aims to maximize the concentration of spectral power to a target region $L$, for a function that is spatially limited to a target region $R$. Conversely, Slepian's spatial concentration problem maximizes the spatial concentration to $R$ of a function bandlimited to $L$. Using $\langle\cdot,\cdot\rangle$ for the inner product both in the space and the spectral domains, both problems are stated equivalently using Rayleigh quotients in the form

$\lambda= \frac{\langle\mathcal{R}\mathcal{H}^{-1}\mathcal{L}\,F, \mathcal{R}\mathcal{H}^{-1}\mathcal{L}\,F\,\rangle} {\langle\mathcal{H}^{-1}\mathcal{L}\,F, \mathcal{H}^{-1}\mathcal{L}\,F\,\rangle}=\frac{\langle\mathcal{L}\mathcal{H}\mathcal{R}f, \mathcal{L}\mathcal{H}\mathcal{R}f\rangle} {\langle\mathcal{H}\mathcal{R}f, \mathcal{H}\mathcal{R} f\rangle}=\mbox{maximum} .$

The equivalent spectral-domain and spatial-domain eigenvalue equations are

$(\mathcal{L}\mathcal{H}\mathcal{R}\mathcal{H}^{-1\!}\mathcal{L})(\mathcal{L}\,F\,) =\lambda(\mathcal{L}\,F\,)$ and $(\mathcal{R}\mathcal{H}^{-1\!}\mathcal{L}\mathcal{H}\mathcal{R})(\mathcal{R}f)=\lambda(\mathcal{R}f),$

given that $\mathcal{H}$ and $\mathcal{H}^{-1}$ are each others' adjoints, and that $\mathcal{R}$ and $\mathcal{L}$ are self-adjoint and idempotent.

The Slepian functions are solutions to either of these types of equations with positive-definite kernels, that is, they are bandlimited functions $G=\mathcal{L}F$, concentrated to the spatial domain within $R$, or spacelimited functions of the form $h=\mathcal{R}f$, concentrated to the spectral domain within $L$.

== Scalar Slepian functions in one dimension ==
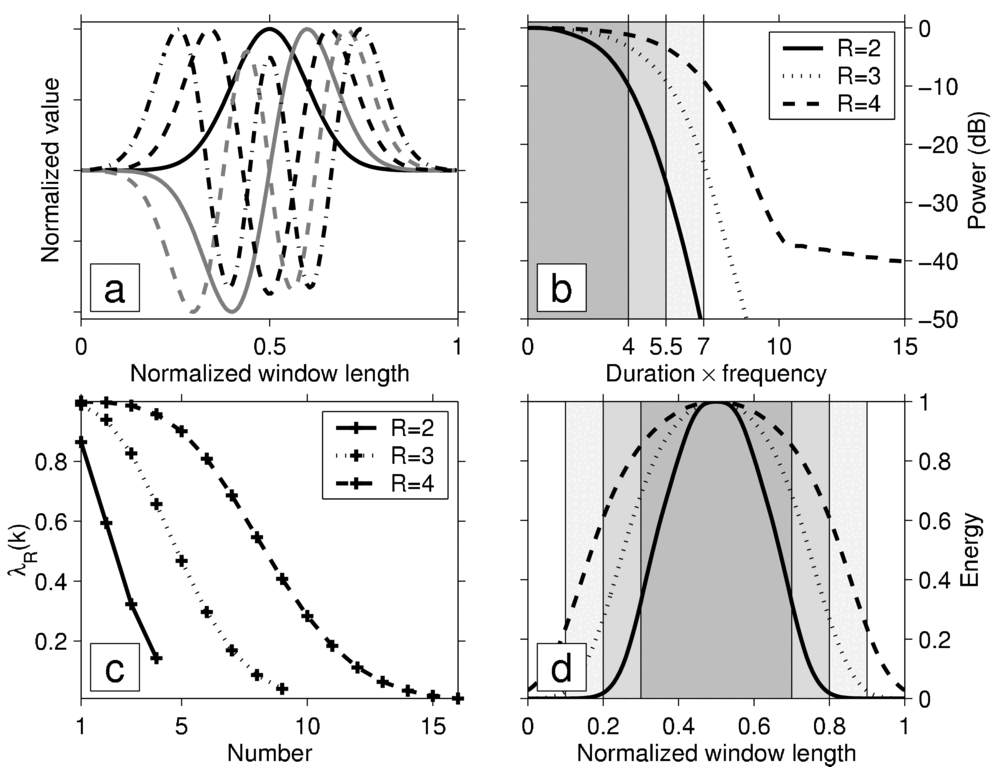
(a) Slepian functions in the time domain. (b) Slepian functions in the frequency domain. Shown is the square of the absolute value of the Fourier transform of the Slepian functions shown in (a). (c) Concentration factors associated with the successive Slepian functions shown in (a). (d) Cumulative energy by summation the square of the Slepian functions shown in (a).

Let $g(t)$ and its Fourier transform $G(\omega)$ be strictly bandlimited in angular frequency between $[-W,W]$. Attempting to concentrate $g(t)$ in the time domain, to be contained within the time interval $[-T,T]$, amounts to maximizing

$\lambda=\frac{\int_{-T}^{T}g^2(t)\,dt}{\int_{-\infty}^\infty g^2(t)\,dt}=\text{maximum} ,$

which is equivalent to solving either, in the frequency domain, the convolutional integral eigenvalue (Fredholm) equation

$\int_{-W}^{W}D_T(\omega,\omega')G(\omega')\,d\omega'=\lambda G(\omega),\qquad D_T(\omega,\omega')=\frac{\sin T(\omega-\omega')}{\pi(\omega-\omega')}, \qquad |\omega|\le W,$

or the time- or space-domain version

$\int_{-T}^{T}D_W(t,t')g(t')\,dt'=\lambda g(t),\qquad D_W(t,t')=\frac{\sin W(t-t')}{\pi(t-t')}= (2\pi)^{-1}\int_{-W}^{W}e^{i\omega(t-t')}d\omega, \qquad t \in \mathbb{R}.$

Either of these can be transformed and rescaled to the dimensionless

$\int_{-1}^{1}D(x,x')g(x')\,dx'=\lambda g(x),\qquad D(x,x')=\frac{\sin TW(x-x')}{\pi(x-x')}.$

The trace of the positive definite kernel is the sum of the infinite number of real and positive eigenvalues,

$N=\sum_{\alpha=1}^\infty \lambda_\alpha=\int_{-1}^{1}D(x,x')\,dx=\frac{2TW}{\pi},$

that is, the area of the concentration domain in time-frequency space (a time-bandwidth product).

One-dimensional scalar Slepian functions or tapers are the workhorse of the Thomson multitaper method of spectral density estimation.

== Scalar Slepian functions in two Cartesian dimensions ==
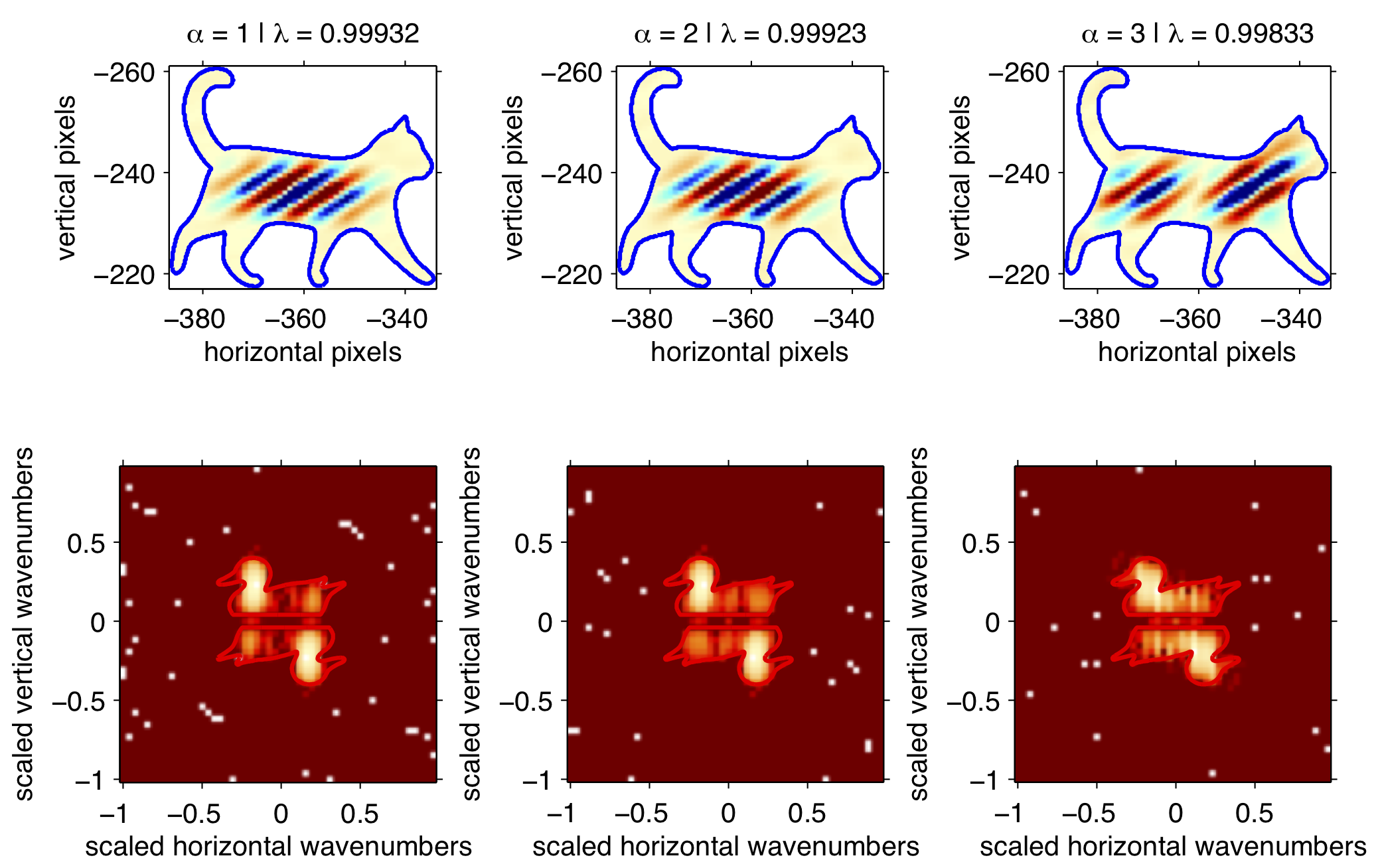
Slepian functions concentrated to a cat-like spatial (top row; rank $\alpha$ and concentration eigenvalue $\lambda$) and a duck-like spectral domain (bottom row; shown is the square of the absolute value of the Fourier transform of the functions shown in the top row).

We use $g(\mathbf{x})$ and its Fourier transform $G(\mathbf{k})$ to denote a function that is strictly bandlimited to $\mathcal{K}$, an arbitrary subregion of the spectral space of spatial wave vectors. Seeking to concentrate $g(\mathbf{x})$ into a finite spatial region $R\in\mathbb{R}^2$, of area $A$, we must find the unknown functions for which

$\lambda=\frac{\int_{R}g^2(\mathbf{x})\,d\mathbf{x}} {\int_{-\infty}^{\infty} g^2(\mathbf{x})\,d\mathbf{x}}=\mbox{maximum}.$

Maximizing this Rayleigh quotient requires solving the Fredholm integral equation

$\int_\mathcal{K}D_R(\mathbf{k},\mathbf{k}')\,G(\mathbf{k}')\,d\mathbf{k}' =\lambda G(\mathbf{k}) , \qquad D_R(\mathbf{k},\mathbf{k}')=(2\pi)^{-2} \int_R e^{i(\mathbf{k}'-\mathbf{k})\cdot\mathbf{x}}\,d\mathbf{x} ,\qquad \mathbf{k}\in\mathcal{K}.$

The corresponding problem in the spatial domain is

$\int_R\! D_\mathcal{K}(\mathbf{x},\mathbf{x}')\,g(\mathbf{x}')\,d\mathbf{x}' =\lambda g(\mathbf{x}),\qquad D_\mathcal{K}(\mathbf{x},\mathbf{x}')=(2\pi)^{-2} \int_\mathcal{K} e^{i\mathbf{k}\cdot(\mathbf{x}-\mathbf{x}')}\,d\mathbf{k},\qquad\mathbf{x}\in\mathbb{R}^2.$

Concentration to the disk-shaped spectral band $\mathcal{K}=\{\mathbf{k}:\|\mathbf{k}\|\le K\}$ allows us to rewrite the spatial kernel as

$D_\mathcal{K}(\mathbf{x},\mathbf{x}')=\frac{KJ_1(K\|\mathbf{x}-\mathbf{x}'\|)}{2\pi\|\mathbf{x}-\mathbf{x}'\|},$

with $J_1$ a Bessel function of the first kind, from which we may derive that

$N=\sum_{\alpha=1}^\infty \lambda_\alpha=\int_RD_\mathcal{K}(\mathbf{x},\mathbf{x})\,d\mathbf{x}=K^2\frac{A}{4\pi},$

in other words, again the area of the concentration domain in space-frequency space (a space-bandwidth product).

== Scalar Slepian functions on the surface of a sphere ==
Spherical Slepian functions of spherical-harmonic bandwidth 18, and of spherical-harmonic order 0 (that is, only made of zonal spherical harmonics), either very well (top row) or very poorly (bottom row) concentrated, as indicated by the concentration ratio $\lambda$ to the North-polar cap of opening angle 40$^\circ$.

We denote $g(\mathbf{\hat{r}})$ a function on the unit sphere $\Omega$ and its spherical harmonic transform coefficient $g_{lm}$ at the degree $l$ and order $m$, respectively, and we consider bandlimitation to spherical harmonic degree $L$, that is, $g\in \mathcal{S}_L$. Maximizing the quadratic energy ratio within the spatial subdomain $R\subset \Omega$ via

$\lambda= \frac{\int_R g^2(\mathbf{\hat{r}})\,d\Omega} {\int_{\Omega}g^2(\mathbf{\hat{r}})\,d\Omega} =\mbox{maximum}$

amounts in the spectral domain to solving the algebraic eigenvalue equation

$\sum_{l'=0}^L\sum_{m'=-l'}^{l'}D_{lm,l'm'}g_{l'm'}=\lambda g_{lm},\qquad D_{lm,l'm'}=\int_R Y_{lm}(\mathbf{\hat{r}})Y_{l'm'}(\mathbf{\hat{r}})\,d\Omega$,

with $Y_{lm}$ the spherical harmonic at degree $l$ and order $m$. The equivalent spatial-domain equation, $\int_R D(\mathbf{\hat{r}},\mathbf{\hat{r}}')g(\mathbf{\hat{r}})\,d\Omega = \lambda g(\mathbf{\hat{r}}),\qquad D(\mathbf{\hat{r}},\mathbf{\hat{r}}') = \sum_{l=0}^L\sum_{m=-l}^{l}Y_{lm}(\mathbf{\hat{r}})Y_{lm}(\mathbf{\hat{r}}') =\sum_{l=0}^L \left(\frac{2l+1}{4\pi}\right) P_l(\mathbf{\hat{r}}\cdot\mathbf{\hat{r}}'),$ is a homogeneous Fredholm integral equation of the second kind, with a finite-rank, symmetric, separable kernel.

The last equality is a consequence of the spherical harmonic addition theorem which involves $P_l$, the Legendre polynomial. The trace of this kernel is given by

$N=\sum_{\alpha=1}^{(L+1)^2}\lambda_\alpha=\int_R D(\mathbf{\hat{r}},\mathbf{\hat{r}})\,d\Omega= \sum_{l=0}^L\sum_{m=-l}^{l}D_{lm,lm} =(L+1)^2\frac{A}{4\pi},$

that is, once again a space-bandwidth product, of the dimension of $\mathcal{S}_L$ and the fractional area of $R$ on the unit sphere $\Omega$, namely $A/(4\pi)$.
