= David J. Thomson =

- Citizenship: Canadian, American
- Education: Acadia University; Polytechnic Institute of Brooklyn
- Known for: Multitaper
- Scientific career
- Fields: Statistics, electrical engineering, physics
- Workplaces: Bell Labs (Mathematical Sciences Division); Queen's University at Kingston

David J. Thomson is a professor in the Department of Mathematics and Statistics at Queen's University in Ontario and a Canada Research Chair in statistics and signal processing, formerly a member of the technical staff at Bell Labs. He is a professional engineer in the province of Ontario, a fellow of the IEEE and a chartered statistician. He holds memberships of the Royal Statistical Society, the American Statistical Association, the Statistical Society of Canada and the American Geophysical Union and, in 2009, received a Killam Research Fellowship (administered through the Canada Council for the Arts). In 2010, he was made a fellow of the Royal Society of Canada. In 2013, he was awarded the Statistical Society of Canada impact award.

He is best known for creation of the multitaper method of spectral estimation, first published in complete form in 1982 in a special issue of Proceedings of the IEEE. Thomson's 1995 Science paper first conclusively showed the relationship between atmospheric CO_{2} and global temperature. Thomson and Bell Labs colleagues Carol G. Maclennan and Louis J. Lanzerotti authored a 1995 Nature paper in which they showed evidence that the magnetic signatures of the Sun's normal modes permeate the interplanetary magnetic field as far as Jupiter. He has written over 100 other peer-reviewed journal articles in the fields of statistics, space physics, climatology and paleoclimatology, and seismology.

== Career ==
Thomson joined the Technical Staff at Bell Labs in 1965, where he was assigned to work on the WT4 Millimeter Waveguide System and the Advanced Mobile Phone Service project. In 1983, he was reassigned to the Communications Analysis Research Department where he remained as a Distinguished Member until his retirement in 2001. During this time, he was

- a Member of the Panel on Sensors and Electron Devices of the Army Research Laboratory Technical Assessment Board
- chairman of Commission C of USNC-URSI
- associate editor for Radio Science
- associate editor for Communications Theory and for Detection and Estimation of the IEEE Transactions on Information Theory
- adjunct professor in the Graduate Department of Scripps Institution of Oceanography
- consulted at the Neurological Institute of Columbia University
- visiting professor at Princeton University (statistical inference)
- visiting professor at Stanford University (time series)
- guest lecturer at Massachusetts Institute of Technology (the Houghton lectures)
- participant at the Isaac Newton Institute at the University of Cambridge

On retirement from Bell Labs, Thomson took a Canada Research Chair at Queen's University at Kingston, where he has remained to this date.
