= Spectral concentration problem =

Problem in Fourier analysis

The three leading Slepian sequences for T=1000 and 2WT=6. Note that each higher order sequence has an extra zero crossing.

The spectral concentration problem in Fourier analysis refers to finding a time sequence of a given length whose discrete Fourier transform is maximally localized on a given frequency interval, as measured by the spectral concentration.

== Spectral concentration ==
The discrete Fourier transform (DFT) U(f) of a finite series $w_t$, $t = 1,2,3,4,...,T$ is defined as

$$U(f) = \sum_{t=1}^{T}w_t e^{-2\pi ift}.$$

In the following, the sampling interval will be taken as Δt = 1, and hence the frequency interval as f ∈ [-1/2,1/2]. U(f) is a periodic function with a period 1.

For a given frequency W such that 0<W<1/2, the spectral concentration $\lambda(T,W)$ of U(f) on the interval [-W,W] is defined as the ratio of power of U(f) contained in the frequency band [-W,W] to the power of U(f) contained in the entire frequency band [-1/2,1/2]. That is,

$$\lambda(T,W) = \frac{\int_{-W}^{W} {\|U(f)\|}^2 \,df} {\int_{-1/2}^{1/2} {\|U(f)\|}^2 \,df}.$$

It can be shown that U(f) has only isolated zeros and hence $0<\lambda(T,W)<1$ (see [1]). Thus, the spectral concentration is strictly less than one, and there is no finite sequence $w_t$ for which the DTFT can be confined to a band [-W,W] and made to vanish outside this band.

== Statement of the problem ==
Among all sequences $\lbrace w_t \rbrace$ for a given T and W, is there a sequence for which the spectral concentration is maximum? In other words, is there a sequence for which the sidelobe energy outside a frequency band [-W,W] is minimum?

The answer is yes; such a sequence indeed exists and can be found by optimizing $\lambda(T,W)$. Thus maximising the power

$$\int_{-W}^{W} {\|U(f)\|}^2 \,df$$

subject to the constraint that the total power is fixed, say

$$\int_{-1/2}^{1/2} {\|U(f)\|}^2 \,df=1,$$

leads to the following equation satisfied by the optimal sequence $w_t$:

$$\sum_{t'=1}^{T} \frac{\sin2\pi W(t-t')} {\pi(t-t')}w_{t'} = \lambda w_{t}.$$

This is an eigenvalue equation for a symmetric matrix given by

$$M_{t,t'} = \frac{\sin2\pi W(t-t')}{\pi(t-t')}.$$

It can be shown that this matrix is positive-definite, hence all the eigenvalues of this matrix lie between 0 and 1. The largest eigenvalue of the above equation corresponds to the largest possible spectral concentration; the corresponding eigenvector is the required optimal sequence $w_t$. This sequence is called a 0^{th}–order Slepian sequence (also known as a discrete prolate spheroidal sequence, or DPSS), which is a unique taper with maximally suppressed sidelobes.

It turns out that the number of dominant eigenvalues of the matrix M that are close to 1, corresponds to N=2WT called the Shannon number. If the eigenvalues $\lambda$ are arranged in decreasing order (i.e., $\lambda_{1}>\lambda_{2}>\lambda_{3}>...>\lambda_{N}$), then the eigenvector corresponding to $\lambda_{n+1}$ is called n^{th}–order Slepian sequence (DPSS) (0≤n≤N-1). This n^{th}–order taper also offers the best sidelobe suppression and is pairwise orthogonal to the Slepian sequences of previous orders $(0,1,2,3....,n-1)$. These lower order Slepian sequences form the basis for spectral estimation by multitaper method.

Not limited to time series, the spectral concentration problem can be reformulated to apply in multiple Cartesian dimensions and on the surface of the sphere by using spherical harmonics, for applications in geophysics and cosmology among others.

== See also ==
- Multitaper
- Fourier transform
- Discrete Fourier transform
