= Institut Rousseau =

French think tank

Rousseau Institute
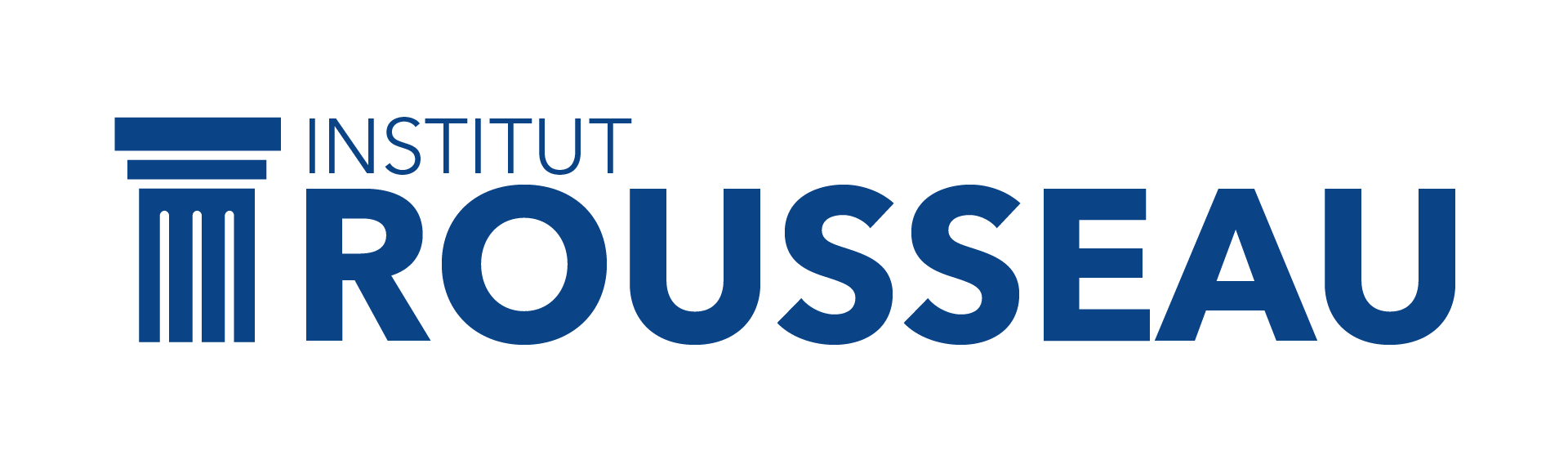
- Established: 04. March 2020
- Mission: Conduct Research and publish Studies
- President: Gaël Giraud (honorary president)
- Head: Nicolas Dufrêne
- Key people: Chloé Ridel
- Location: Paris, France
- Website: https://institut-rousseau.fr/

The Rousseau Institute is a French think tank created in 2020, led by Nicolas Dufrêne and Chloé Ridel. The institute publishes mainly works relating to the French and European economy.

Main areas of research concentrate on the climate transition, digital sovereignty, egalitarian democracy and republican participation.

== Overview ==
The Rousseau Institute is a think tank created on 4 March 2020 in Paris and which defines itself as a "laboratory of ideas which attempts to reconcile republican refoundation and political ecology".

The institute sees itself in the tradition of Jean-Jacques Rousseau, who emphasised the sovereignty of the people, and free will based on exercised reason as the path to modernity. The institute's work follows a generalist framework.

The French newspaper L'Humanité classifies the journal on the left side of the political spectrum.

== Operations ==
Headed by Nicolas Dufrêne, a senior civil servant and essayist, the Rousseau Institute has had the economist Gaël Giraud as its honorary president since 2020. Its deputy director is Chloé Ridel, a senior civil servant and specialist in European issues. Its director of studies is Benjamin Morel, lecturer in public law.

Its scientific council has some twenty members, including the demographer Hervé Le Bras, the geographer Anaïs Voy-Gillis, and magistrate Magali Lafourcade. Fabien Escalona, Pavlina R. Tcherneva, Nathan Sperber and Christophe Ventura are also part of the scientific board.

The institute is financed by donations and membership fees. It is constituted as an association.

== Position papers ==
=== Climate transformation ===
With the position paper 2% for 2 degrees: Investment needs for the climate neutrality of France in 2050, the institute has presented an overall cost calculation for the climate neutrality of France. Based on sector analyses, an overall financing requirement and fields of action were identified, and proposals for financing were elaborated.

An executive summary of the French report is available in English. Key statements of the report include

- The climate targets for the 2 °C goal of the Paris Climate Agreement could be met for France with additional annual expenditure of €57 billion (2.3% of French GDP in Covid-reduced year 2021)
- Total costs of climate adaptation amount to €182 billion per year, of which €125 billion can be covered by reallocating existing and planned spending to climate transformation projects alone.
- The Institute identifies 7 fields of action (transport, buildings, industry, energy, agriculture, waste management, negative emissions and institutional reforms) for which a priority list of 33 emergency measures is proposed.
- Based on these measures, France's emissions (of all greenhouse gases in CO_{2}eq) should fall by 87% by 2050, while the negative emissions sector's contribution would make France emissions-negative. The aim is to bring France back on the Fit for 55 path.

=== Other works ===
The institute also publishes on Issues concerning monetary policy. One of the proposals promoted by the Rousseau Institute is to cancel the sovereign debts held by the European Central Bank in exchange for investments to finance "ecological reconstruction". Nicolas Dufrêne, director of the institute, argues that cancelling the debts held by the central bank "would not harm anyone" and "will free up investment capacity to develop the ecological and social resilience of our societies".

N. Dufrêne published a book with Alain Grandjean in February 2020 to defend this proposal, Une monnaie écologique, pour sauver la planète (Publisher: Odile Jacob). He is also the initiator of a tribune signed by nearly 150 economists and politicians, published in February 2021 in several European media publiciations.

This proposal has been criticised by several politicians, such as the President of the European Central Bank, Christine Lagarde, who considers debt cancellation by the ECB "unthinkable".

Five members of the Rousseau Institute, including the economist Gaël Giraud and Nicolas Dufrêne, also have a simplification of the method of calculating income tax, promoting it under consideration of to progressiveness and social justice: the ABC tax.

The Rousseau Institute's work also focuses on digital sovereignty.

The institute's proposals focus in particular on the following two areas focussing on French political sphere:

- « Reinvest in the idea of a shared republican reason and of a common good for humanity.. »
- « Sovereignty must return to the people who, through the Republic, must make the State the instrument for shaping their future. »
- Based on the observation that decentralisation has failed for 40 years in France, the Institute wishes to "abolish the regions and give autonomy and inspiration back to the communes"[16].

The institute, together with the American economist Pavlina R. Tcherneva, estimate that one million "green" jobs could be created in France and that there is a significant source of jobs that could be based on temporary public utility jobs, based on voluntary work. In her book The Job Guarantee, Tcherneva states that "these choices would cost nothing to the community since they would consist of redeploying aid already paid to the unemployed.

=== Commentary ===
Lenny Benbara (Head of Publications at the Rousseau Institute) commented in the French magazine Marianne on the think tank's mission by saying

"Republicanism is a response to the other great threat hanging over us: the spectre of division, fragmentation and isolation of individuals in a society where all instances of solidarity are being dismantled. Republicanism is therefore neither a slogan nor an ideological posture, but a solution to prevent France from breaking up into antagonistic archipelagos. If the law of the strongest were to apply in the future, society would risk being more violent than it has ever been due to climate change."
