= The Shift Project =

French nonprofit think tank

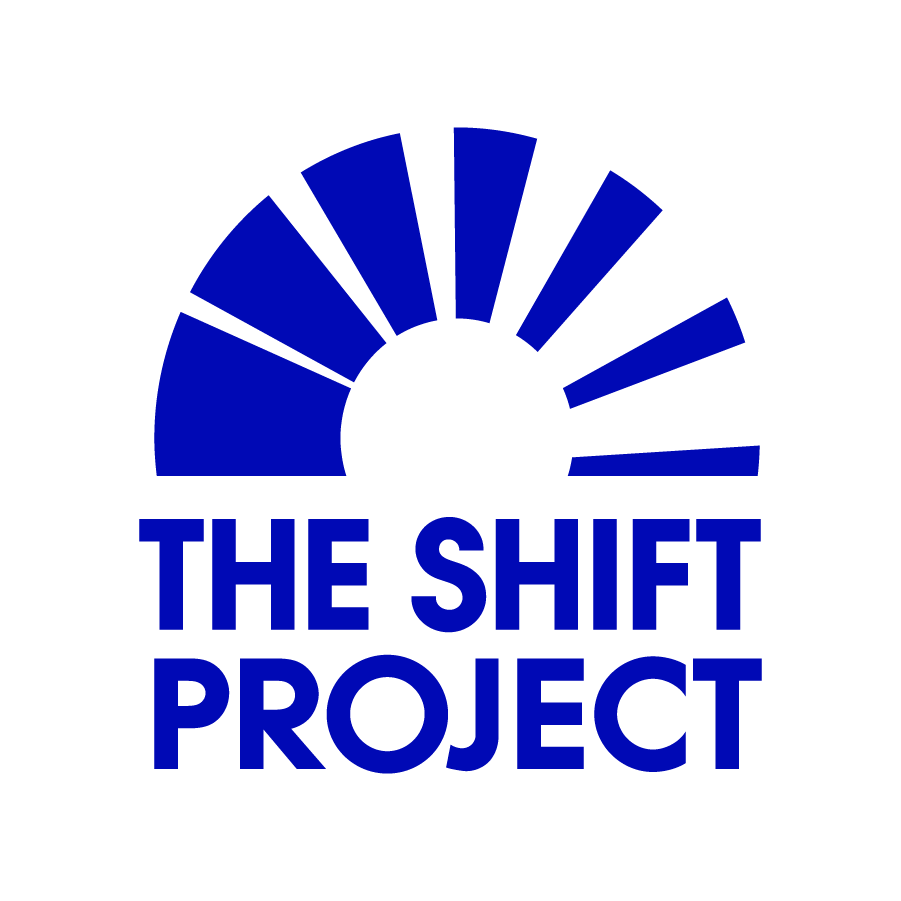
- Named after: Redesigning the Economy to Achieve Carbon Transition
- Formation: 1 January 2010; 16 years ago
- Founded at: 16–18 rue de Budapest; Paris France
- Type: Nonprofit / Think-tank
- Purpose: Climate change mitigation
- Region served: International
- Key people: Jean-Marc Jancovici (président), Matthieu Auzanneau (director), Alain Grandjean, Gaël Giraud, Hervé Le Treut, Jean-Pascal van Ypersele
- Website: theshiftproject.org/en

The Shift Project (also called The Shift or TSP) is a French nonprofit created in 2010 that aims to limit both climate change and the dependency of the economy on fossil fuels.

== Presentation, goals and organization ==
The Shift Project is a French nonprofit created in January 2010 in Paris by energy-climate experts such as Jean-Marc Jancovici, Geneviève Férone-Creuzet and Michel Lepetit. The organization aims to address two issues raised by the use of carbon: climate change and the depletion of fossil fuels. The Shift works as a think tank that shares ideas with economic, political, academic and voluntary actors.

The Shift Project is funded by corporate sponsors. Its budget for 2017 was about 600,000 euros.

The organization is led by a group of three people elected by the board of directors, which includes members of the sponsoring companies. A group of experts, called the "Expert Committee" (Comité des experts), ensures the scientific validity of the work done by The Shift Project. This group of experts (in economics, finance, climate, physics, history etc.) includes Alain Grandjean, Gaël Giraud, Hervé Le Treut, Jean-Pascal van Ypersele and Jacques Treiner. When the think tank was created, the first director was Cédric Ringenbach. He held this position until 2016, when he left The Shift Project and created the nonprofit organization The Climate Collage, which was later renamed to The Climate Fresk. Now headed by Matthieu Auzanneau, The Shift has a team of about ten employees and works with volunteers who are grouped into an independent nonprofit called The Shifters.

The Shift examines the dependency of our economy on oil through three angles: the potential return of economic growth, the issues related to the finite amount of oil and, of course, the climate change due to carbon emissions. According to The Shift, although the GDP may have use cases, it is not really useful, especially because it does not consider natural resources (so it does not account for their limited availability) or resulting externalities like greenhouse gas emissions.

== Projects, events and activities ==
Since 2012, The Shift Project has organized an annual two-day meeting called The Shift Forum with the objective of running a debate between big industrial and financial company leaders and experts on climate, energy and economics. The Shift also organizes many public events, sometimes in collaboration with other organizations like the Business and Climate Summit 2015 or the World Efficiency 2015.

The nonprofit also contributed to the National Debate for Energy Transition in France and its president, Jean-Marc Jancovici, is a member of the French Committee on Climate Change.

=== Main publications ===
The Shift mostly works in task forces: for a couple of months or years, a group of experts (from higher education and academic research, NGOs, public sector, companies...) is set up on a well-defined question. When the project ends, the task force writes a report and presents it to concerned actors. The report is then made publicly available.

Addressed issues include the building rehabilitation to make them more energy-efficient, the relation between energy and GDP, alternative metrics to GDP, the scientific rigor of energy scenarios, sustainable mobility or the price of carbon.

For the price of carbon in Europe, the Shift suggests to set a reservation price to 20 euros and increase it every year.

Since 2013, The Shift has been gathering experts on the energy rehabilitation of buildings and made propositions like the Energy Efficiency Passport. In addition to being experimented by the Shift through the nonprofit organization Expérience P2E, this building passport was then included in the Energy Transition Law and is now used by various actors in the building industry.

In 2016, at The Shift Project request, the engineer Francisco Luciano gathered a team of experts including SNCF, Vinci Autoroutes, EDF, the CVTC, start-ups in car sharing, the senior official Olivier Paul-Dubois-Taine and researchers. In September 2017, The Shift published the report "Decarbonize mid-density areas – Less carbon more bond", for which The Shift and the project leader Francisco Luciano were invited by the Ministry for Transportation to attend the Mobility Foundations and various governmental working groups. The report, which is aimed to be well-argued and quantitative, concludes that it is possible to strongly decarbonize mobility in suburban areas thanks to cycling, car sharing and fast public transports. The working group also studied the delivery of goods and remote work.

On 4 October 2018, the think tank published a report on the digital economy impact on climate and environment. The report notes that the worldwide energy consumption of the digital economy grows at a very fast rate (about 9% a year) with a worsening energy efficiency, unlike most economic sectors. It concludes by advocating digital sobriety to minimize most of this impact growth.

== Pledge for climate: The 2017 Decarbonize Europe Manifesto ==
=== The call for action of the economic actors ===
On 21 March 2017, the think tank made public the signatories of a text called "Decarbonize Europe Manifesto". This text is described as a wake-up call 15 months after the Paris Agreement. It begins with: "We, the signatories of this Manifesto to decarbonize Europe, call upon all European States to immediately implement policies aiming to achieve a level of greenhouse gas emissions close to zero by 2050!" and aims to "guarantee peace". It ends with: "We call upon all European actors – individuals, businesses and public authorities – to implement concrete and coherent strategies which can meet the challenge posed by climate change and the limits of natural resources.http://decarbonizeurope.org/en/" The Shift project claims the decarbonization of Europe is a challenge, but it is necessary for a modern future.

It is supported by more than 3,000 citizens including 80 company directors and around forty scientists and political figures. The press mainly mentions the signature of economic leaders like the magazine Challenges: "Climate: Why the company directors (at last) unite to decarbonize Europe".

The think tank then called candidates running for president for a commitment in favor of a European plan to fight climate change that would abide by the Paris Agreement

=== Signatories of the Manifesto ===
Company directors who signed the Manifesto include Elisabeth Borne (RATP), Martin Bouygues (Bouygues), Patricia Barbizet (Artémis-Kering), Guillaume Pepy (SNCF), Christophe Cuvillier (Unibail Rodamco), Nicolas Dufourcq (Bpifrance), Pierre Blayau (Caise centrale de réassurance), Stéphane Richard (Orange), Alain Montarant (MACIF), Nicolas Théry (Crédit Mutuel), Denis Kessler (SCOR), Xavier Huillard (Vinci), Jean-Dominique Senard (Michelin) and Agniès Ogier (Thalys).

Scientists who signed the Manifesto include climatologists like Jean Jouzel, Hervé Le Treut and Jean-Pascal van Ypersele; the biologist and senior official Dominique Dron; the mathematician Ivar Ekeland; physicists like Sébastien Balibar, Roger Balian and Yves Bréchet; economists like Gaël Giraud, Roger Guesnerie, Philippe Aghion, Christian de Perthuis, Jean-Marie Chevalier and Jean-Charles Hourcade; directors of grandes écoles like Meriem Fournier (AgroParis-Tech Nancy), Olivier Oger (EDHEC) and Vincent Laflèche (Mines ParisTech).

Other people who signed it include former ministers like Arnaud Montebourg, Serge Lepeltier, the Belgian Philippe Maystadt and the president of the union CFE-CGC François Hommeril.

=== Nine proposals ===
The Shift Project published "9 propositions to take Europe to a new area" about as many projects that should be done imperatively to meet the Paris Agreement, according to the Shift. The AFP specifies that these propositions are made "in parallel with the Manifesto" and are not "endorsed by the signatories". The daily economic newspaper Les Échos highlights the "plan for a 'carbon-free' Europe".

These propositions concern seven sectors: electricity, transportation, construction, industry, food, agriculture and forestry. They are described in depth in the book "Let's decarbonize!".
