= Michael Ghil =

- מִיכָאֵל גִיל
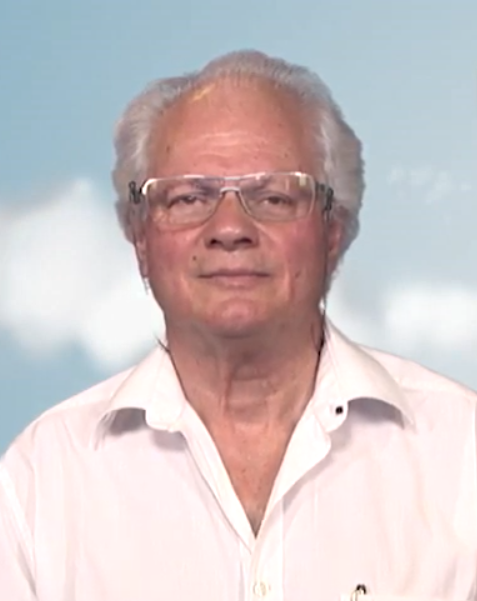
- Born: June 10, 1944; Budapest, Hungary
- Education: Technion – Israel Institute of Technology, Courant Institute of Mathematical Sciences
- Known for: Boolean Delay Equations, Climate Dynamics, Data Assimilation, El Niño-Southern Oscillation, Singular Spectrum Analysis
- Awards: APS Fellow (2022); A. Wegener Medal (2012); L. F. Richardson Medal (2004)
- Scientific career
- Fields: Climate Science
- Workplaces: UCLA, École normale supérieure
- Thesis: (1975)
- Doctoral advisor: Peter Lax
- Notable students: Hervé Le Treut

Michael Ghil (Hebrew: מִיכָאֵל גִיל; born 10 June 1944 in Budapest, Hungary) is an American and European mathematician and physicist, focusing on the climate sciences and their interdisciplinary aspects. He is a founder of theoretical climate dynamics, as well as of advanced data assimilation methodology. He has systematically applied dynamical systems theory to planetary-scale flows, both atmospheric and oceanic. Ghil has used these methods to proceed from simple flows with high temporal regularity and spatial symmetry to the observed flows, with their complex behavior in space and time. His studies of climate variability on many time scales have used a full hierarchy of models, from the simplest 'toy' models all the way to atmospheric, oceanic and coupled general circulation models. Recently, Ghil has also worked on modeling and data analysis in population dynamics, macroeconomics, and the climate–economy–biosphere system.

He is currently a Distinguished Research Professor at the University of California, Los Angeles and a Distinguished Professor Emeritus at the École Normale Supérieure, Paris.

== Early life and education ==
Ghil spent his childhood in Romania before moving to Israel. He studied Mechanical Engineering at the Technion–Israel Institute of Technology, Haifa, Israel from where he received his B.Sc. in August 1966, and his M.Sc. in June 1971. He studied mathematics at the Courant Institute of Mathematical Sciences, New York University, New York from where he received a Master's in February 1973 and a Ph.D. in June 1975, under the supervision of Peter Lax (Abel Prize 2005). His doctoral dissertation title was "A Nonlinear Parabolic Equation with Applications to Climate Theory".

== Career ==
Ghil was affiliated with the Courant Institute of Mathematical Sciences, from September 1971 until May 1987, first as a Research Assistant (1971–1975) and then as a Research Professor (1982–1987), via intermediate appointments. While in New York, he was a NAS/NRC Research Associate at the NASA Goddard Institute for Space Studies, New York from August 1975 to September 1976.

In 1985 Ghil was appointed a full professor of Climate Dynamics at the Department of Atmospheric Sciences at the University of California, Los Angeles, where he also served as a chairman of the same Department from September 1988 to June 1992. From July 1994 until June 2003 he was appointed Distinguished Professor of Climate Dynamics at UCLA, as well as the Director of the Institute of Geophysics & Planetary Physics, UCLA, from July 1992 until June 2003. He served as the Director of the Environmental Research & Teaching Institute (CERES-ERTI), of École Normale Supérieure in Paris from November 2002 until September 2010 and as a Head of the Geosciences Department of ENS from July 2003 until December 2009, where he was also a Distinguished Professor of Geosciences from September 2002 until September 2012.

Since October 2003 until today, he is a Distinguished Research Professor of Atmospheric and Oceanic Sciences at the University of California, Los Angeles. He is also a Distinguished Professor Emeritus at École Normale Supérieure, Paris from September 2012.

== Research ==
Ghil has played an important role in the foundations of modern theoretical climate dynamics. During the late 1970s, he worked in the application of dynamical systems theory to problems of the climate sciences. Starting from the work of Budyko and Sellers, Ghil proposed a 1D Energy Balance Model able to provide a succinct but essentially correct description of the climate system. Ghil's analysis complemented the ones by Budyko and Sellers and played a key role for understanding the multistability of the Earth system, which features competing snowball and warm states. Paleoclimatological evidence that the Earth had indeed experienced snowball episodes in the Pre-Cambrian emerged in the 1990s. Energy balance models like Ghil's, once supplemented with stochastic forcings (along the direction of Hasselmann's programme) led to the discovery of phenomena like stochastic resonance.

Throughout the 1980s and 1990s Ghil contributed to the development of data assimilation techniques in meteorology and oceanography, and to the theory of low-frequency variability of the atmosphere (with a special emphasis on the study of blocking), as well as to the understanding of large-scale ocean dynamics. He introduced the use of advanced spectral methods for the analysis of chaotic geophysical time series, and most prominently the singular-spectrum analysis technique (SSA). In the 2000s, he extended his studies of the El Niño-Southern Oscillation phenomenon (ENSO) using Boolean delay and delay differential equations, and worked on the statistics and dynamics of extreme events. Recently, Ghil proposed the pullback attractor as a mathematical framework able to encompass the random and time-dependent nature of the climate system. Another area of research has been the development of data-driven methods for reconstructing the surrogate dynamics of partially observed systems. Additionally, he has contributed to data analysis and modeling in macroeconomics and population dynamics, as well as to coupled climate-economy-biosphere modeling.

== Honors and awards ==
- 2022 American Physical Society Fellow
- 2012 A. Wegener Medal & Honorary Member, European Geosciences Union (EGU)
- 2010 Honorary Member, Hungarian Academy of Sciences
- 2005 Lorenz Lecture, American Geophysical Union
- 2005 Foreign Member, Austrian Academy of Sciences (OeAW)
- 2004 L. F. Richardson Medal, European Geosciences Union
- 2002 Honorary Fellow of the Royal Astronomical Society
- 1998 Member, Academia Europaea
- 1995 Fellow, American Geophysical Union
- 1991 - 1992 Guggenheim Fellow
- 1988 Fellow, American Meteorological Society

== Publications ==
A selection of books and papers is given below.

=== Selected books ===
- Bengtsson, Lennart; Ghil, Michael; Källén, Erland, eds. (1981). Dynamic Meteorology: Data Assimilation Methods. Applied Mathematical Sciences. Vol. 36. New York, NY: Springer New York. doi:10.1007/978-1-4612-5970-1. ISBN 978-0-387-90632-4.
- Ghil, Michael; Benzi, R.; Parisi, Giorgio; fisica, Società italiana di (1985). Turbulence and Predictability in Geophysical Fluid Dynamics and Climate Dynamics. Proceedings of the International School of Physics "Enrico Fermi", Course LXXXVIII. Amsterdam; New York: North Holland. ISBN 978-0-444-86936-4.
- Ghil, M.; Childress, S. (1987). Topics in Geophysical Fluid Dynamics: Atmospheric Dynamics, Dynamo Theory, and Climate Dynamics. Vol. 60. New York, NY: Springer New York. doi:10.1007/978-1-4612-1052-8. ISBN 978-0-387-96475-1.

=== Selected papers ===
Theory of Climate Dynamics and Climate Variability

- Ghil, Michael (1976). "Climate Stability for a Sellers-Type Model". Journal of the Atmospheric Sciences. 33 (1): 3–20. Bibcode:1976JAtS...33....3G. doi:10.1175/1520-0469(1976)033<0003:CSFAST>2.0.CO;2. ISSN 0022-4928.
- Ghil, M.; Vautard, R. (1991). "Interdecadal oscillations and the warming trend in global temperature time series". Nature. 350 (6316): 324–327. Bibcode:1991Natur.350..324G. doi:10.1038/350324a0. ISSN 0028-0836.
- Ghil, Michael; Chekroun, Mickaël D.; Simonnet, Eric (2008). "Climate dynamics and fluid mechanics: Natural variability and related uncertainties". Physica D: Nonlinear Phenomena. 237 (14–17): 2111–2126. arXiv:1006.2864. Bibcode:2008PhyD..237.2111G. doi:10.1016/j.physd.2008.03.036.
- Ghil, Michael (2019). "A Century of Nonlinearity in the Geosciences". Earth and Space Science. 6 (7): 1007–1042. Bibcode:2019E&SS....6.1007G. doi:10.1029/2019EA000599. ISSN 2333-5084.
- Ghil, Michael; Lucarini, Valerio (2020-07-31). "The physics of climate variability and climate change". Reviews of Modern Physics. 92 (3) 035002. arXiv:1910.00583. Bibcode:2020RvMP...92c5002G. doi:10.1103/RevModPhys.92.035002. ISSN 0034-6861.

Paleoclimate

- Källén, E.; Crafoord, C.; Ghil, M. (1979). "Free Oscillations in a Climate Model with Ice-Sheet Dynamics". Journal of the Atmospheric Sciences. 36 (12): 2292–2303. Bibcode:1979JAtS...36.2292K. doi:10.1175/1520-0469(1979)036<2292:FOIACM>2.0.CO;2. ISSN 0022-4928.
- Ghil, Michael (1994). "Cryothermodynamics: the chaotic dynamics of paleoclimate". Physica D: Nonlinear Phenomena. 77 (1–3): 130–159. Bibcode:1994PhyD...77..130G. doi:10.1016/0167-2789(94)90131-7.
- Boers, Niklas; Ghil, Michael; Stocker, Thomas F (2022-09-01). "Theoretical and paleoclimatic evidence for abrupt transitions in the Earth system". Environmental Research Letters. 17 (9): 093006. Bibcode:2022ERL....17i3006B. doi:10.1088/1748-9326/ac8944. ISSN 1748-9326.

Data assimilation

- Ghil, Michael; Malanotte-Rizzoli, Paola (1991). "Data Assimilation in Meteorology and Oceanography". Advances in Geophysics. Vol. 33. Elsevier. pp. 141–266. doi:10.1016/s0065-2687(08)60442-2. ISBN 978-0-12-018833-8.
- Carrassi, Alberto; Ghil, Michael; Trevisan, Anna; Uboldi, Francesco (2008-06-01). "Data assimilation as a nonlinear dynamical systems problem: Stability and convergence of the prediction-assimilation system". Chaos: An Interdisciplinary Journal of Nonlinear Science. 18 (2): 023112. arXiv:0711.3741. Bibcode:2008Chaos..18b3112C. doi:10.1063/1.2909862. ISSN 1054-1500. PMID 18601479.

Blockings

- Legras, B.; Ghil, M. (1985). "Persistent Anomalies, Blocking and Variations in Atmospheric Predictability". Journal of the Atmospheric Sciences. 42 (5): 433–471. Bibcode:1985JAtS...42..433L. doi:10.1175/1520-0469(1985)042<0433:PABAVI>2.0.CO;2. ISSN 0022-4928.

Dynamical Systems Theory

- Chekroun, Mickaël D.; Simonnet, Eric; Ghil, Michael (2011). "Stochastic climate dynamics: Random attractors and time-dependent invariant measures". Physica D: Nonlinear Phenomena. 240 (21): 1685–1700. Bibcode:2011PhyD..240.1685C. doi:10.1016/j.physd.2011.06.005.
- Ghil, Michael (2017). "The wind-driven ocean circulation: Applying dynamical systems theory to a climate problem". Discrete & Continuous Dynamical Systems - A. 37 (1): 189–228. doi:10.3934/dcds.2017008. ISSN 1553-5231.
- Charó, Gisela D.; Chekroun, Mickaël D.; Sciamarella, Denisse; Ghil, Michael (2021-10-01). "Noise-driven topological changes in chaotic dynamics". Chaos: An Interdisciplinary Journal of Nonlinear Science. 31 (10). arXiv:2010.09611. Bibcode:2021Chaos..31j3115C. doi:10.1063/5.0059461. ISSN 1054-1500. PMID 34717329.

Macroeconomics & coupled climate-macroeconomics

- Hallegatte, Stéphane; Ghil, Michael (2008). "Natural disasters impacting a macroeconomic model with endogenous dynamics". Ecological Economics. 68 (1–2): 582–592. Bibcode:2008EcoEc..68..582H. doi:10.1016/j.ecolecon.2008.05.022.
- Groth, Andreas; Ghil, Michael (2017). "Synchronization of world economic activity" (PDF). Chaos: An Interdisciplinary Journal of Nonlinear Science. 27 (12): 127002. Bibcode:2017Chaos..27l7002G. doi:10.1063/1.5001820. ISSN 1054-1500. PMID 29289036.
