= Van Ypersele de Strihou =

van Ypersele de Strihou is a Belgian Noble House. Notable people with the surname include:

- Jean-Pascal van Ypersele de Strihou (born 1957), Belgian academic climatologist
- Jacques van Ypersele de Strihou (born 1936), Belgian politician and dignitary of the Belgian Court.
