= Walloon platform for the IPCC =

Facilitates contacts between IPCC and politicians

The Walloon platform for the IPCC (Plateforme Wallonne pour le GIEC) was established with the assistance of the Walloon government in Belgium to facilitate contacts between the IPCC, the scientific world and politicians. GIEC is the French acronym of IPCC.

== Activities ==
- Monthly thematic information folder
- List of experts who can advise authorities, organisations and citizens
- Monitoring the impacts of climate change Wallonia

== Responsible person ==
Professor Jean-Pascal van Ypersele
