= Chloé Ridel =

French politician (born 1991)

Chloé Ridel MEP
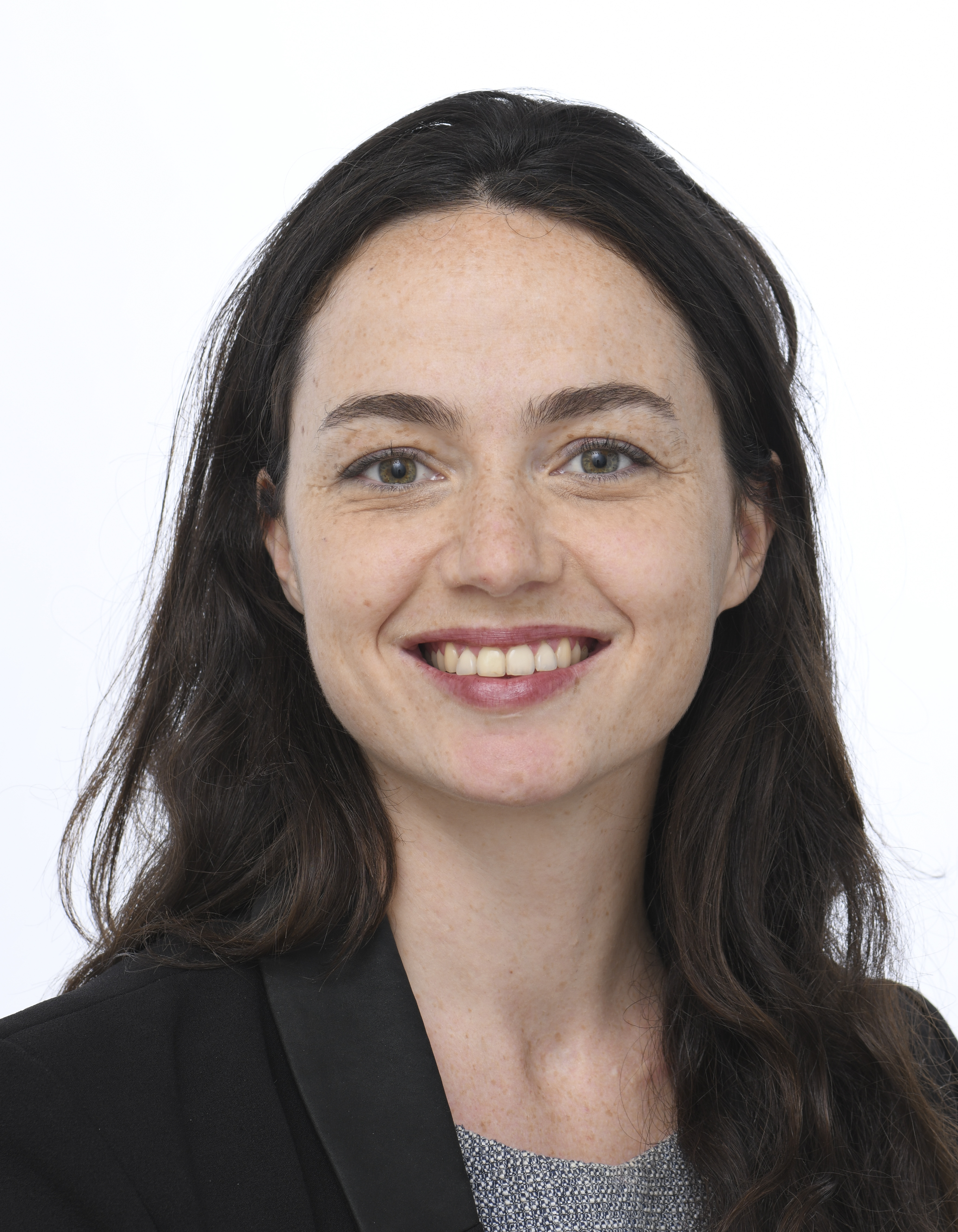

Member of the European Parliament for France
- Incumbent
- Assumed office 16 July 2024

Personal details
- Born: 25 November 1991 (age 34) Clamart, France
- Party: Socialist Party (since 2023)
- Other political affiliations: Party of European Socialists

Chloé Ridel (born 25 November 1991) is a French politician of the Socialist Party (PS). She was elected member of the European Parliament in 2024. She has been serving as a spokesperson for PS since March 2023.

== Early life and career ==
Ridel was born in Clamart.

She is the co-founder of Mieux Voter, which advocates for majority judgement as a replacement for uninominal voting. In 2020, she co-founded the left-wing think tank Institut Rousseau. For the 2022 legislative election, she was approached by the Radical Party of the Left to be a candidate for Gard's 6th constituency, but declined to run.
