= Alain Grandjean =

French engineer and climate economist

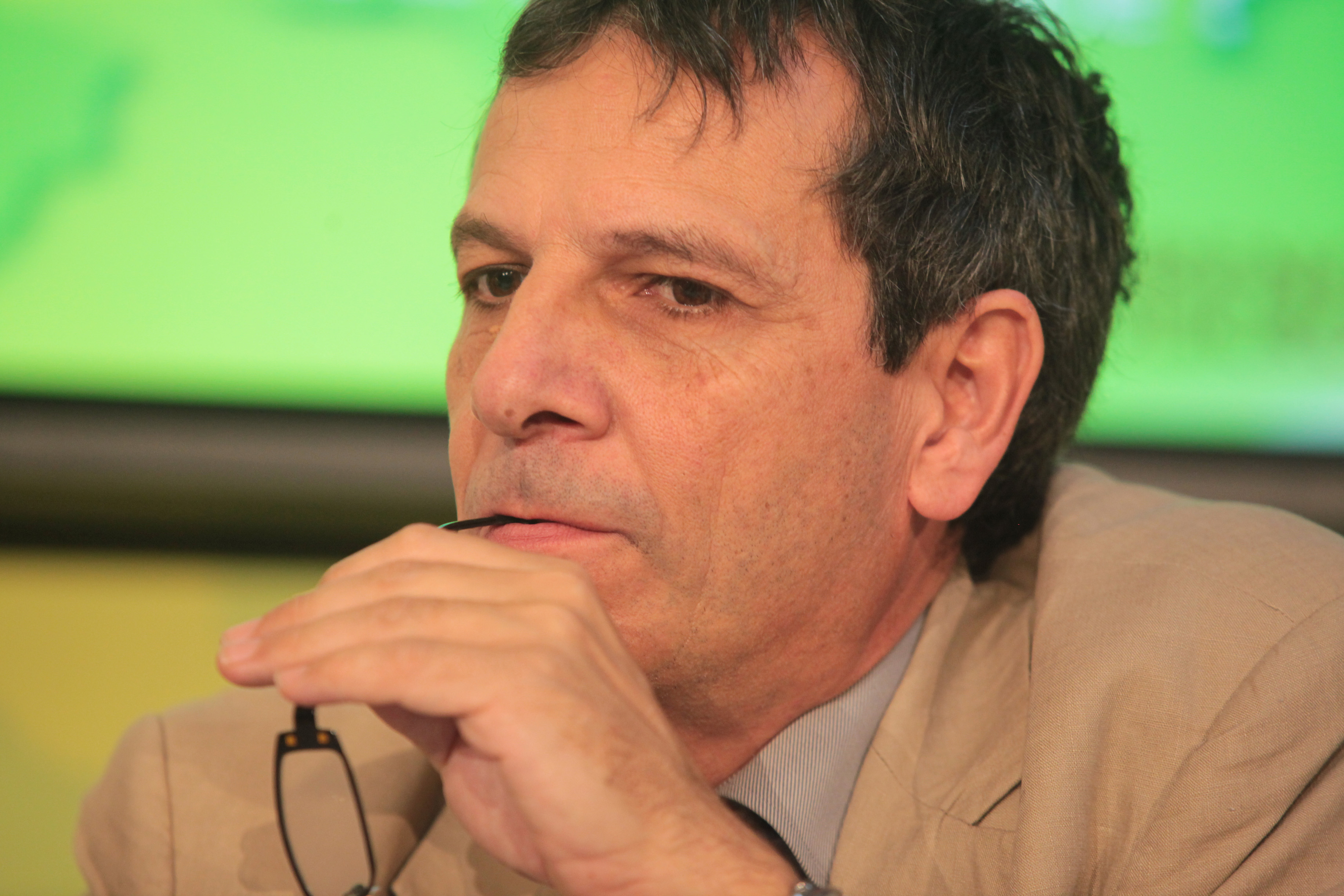
Alain Grandjean in 2009

Alain Grandjean (born 1955) is a French economist, and businessman. Alongside Jean-Marc Jancovici, he co-founded Carbone 4. Grandjean is a member of the High Council on Climate, and the president of the Fondation pour la nature et l'homme since 2019.

== Biography ==
Grandjean graduated from École polytechnique – X in 1975 – and from ENSAE (National school for statistics and economical administration) (Note: En tant qu'école d'application, après sa sortie de l'École polytechnique en 1978.) in 1980. He holds a PhD in environmental economy (1983).

=== Institutional works ===
Alain Grandjean has been a member of the Ecological committee and the Strategy committee of Fondation Nicolas-Hulot pour la nature et l'homme since 2005. He is one of the authors of the "Carbon Tax" chapter of the Ecological Pact of Nicolas Hulot. He is also a member of the panel of experts in "The Shift Project" think tank, and a member of the Economic Council for sustainable development – advising the Ministry of Ecological Transition, Sustainable Development and Energy.

He joined the first Quinet committee of the Centre d'Analyse Stratégique, on the setting up of a carbon benchmark value. He represented the Fondation Hulot at the 1st workshop (Energy-climate) of the "Grenelle de l'environnement", the Rocard committee on the "climate-energy contribution" (also known as "carbon tax") as well as the Juppé/Rocard committee on a large scale national loan known as Grand Emprunt.

He co-chairs with Pascal Canfin the "Mobilizing fundings for climate" mission instigated by French President François Hollande prior to the COP 21. He also co-chairs with Pascal Canfin and Gérard Mestrallet, the "mission on European-level carbon pricing" requested by Segolène Royal – then French minister for the Environment and President of the COP21.

He takes part to the second Quinet committee for France Strategy on a carbon benchmark value. He then takes part the AcTE committee (on accelerating the ecological transition) within the French Ministry of Ecological and Solidarity Transition, founded by Nicolas Hulot, with Jean-Dominique Senard as chairman.

== Works ==
- La monnaie dévoilée, with Gabriel Galand, Éditions L'Harmattan, 1996 ISBN 2738449107.
- Environnement et Entreprises, with Dominique Bourg and Thierry Libaert, Village Mondial, 2006.
- Le plein s'il vous plaît !, with Jean-Marc Jancovici, Éditions du Seuil, February 2006 ISBN 2020857928, reissued. 2010.
- C'est maintenant ! 3 ans pour sauver le monde, with Jean-Marc Jancovici, Éditions du Seuil, January 2009 ISBN 9782020987684.
- Les états et le carbone, with Patrick Criqui et Benoît Faraco, PUF, 2009.
- Vers une société sobre et désirable, with the fondation Nicolas Hulot, PUF, 2010.
- Miser (vraiment) sur la transition écologique, with Hélène Le Teno, with a foreword from Nicolas Hulot, Les Éditions de l'Atelier, mars 2014 ISBN 9782708242593.
- Financer la transition énergétique : carbone, climat et argent, with Mireille Martini, foreword from Nicolas Hulot, Éditions de l'Atelier, août 2016 ISBN 9782708244986.
- Agir sans attendre. Notre plan pour le climat, préface de Nicolas Hulot, Les liens qui libèrent, 2019 ISBN 979-1020907240
- L'illusion de la finance verte, with Julien Lefournier, foreword from Gaël Giraud, Éditions de l'Atelier, Mai 2021, ISBN 978-2708253735

== Awards ==
- Chevalier de la Légion d'honneur He is appointed to Knight of the Légion d'honneur on December 31, 2013.
