= The Climate Fresk =

French nonprofit organization

- La fresque du climat
- Formation: December 2018; 7 years ago
- Founder: Cédric Ringenbach
- Legal status: Nonprofit
- Purpose: To raise public awareness about climate change
- Headquarters: Paris, France
- Region served: worldwide
- Methods: serious game
- Website: climatefresk.org

The Climate Fresk is a French nonprofit organization founded in December 2018 whose aim is to raise public awareness about climate change. It proposes a collaborative serious game using 42 cards where the participants draw a fresco, hence "fresk", which summarizes the work of the Intergovernmental Panel on Climate Change. As of 2023, over a million people have participated.

== Origins and aims ==
The Climate Fresk was created in 2015 by Cédric Ringenbach, former director of The Shift Project from 2010 to 2016, to raise public awareness about climate change. In December 2018, he created an organization to spread the game and train facilitators.

== Functioning of the workshop ==
The workshop lasts three hours and is divided into three distinct phases. The first phase consists in discovering and linking the cards by cause-consequence relationships to build the Fresk as explained in the IPCC reports. The second phase is creative: the participants decorate the Fresk and choose a title. The last phase is a debrief enabling a discussion about players' feelings, positions, questions and both individual and collective solutions.

== Audience ==
The workshops are open to everyone but the game has been initially distributed to higher education organisations and companies.

By 2023, more than 1 million people had completed the workshop. That number had risen to more than 2 million by 2025.

== See also ==
- The Shift Project
- IPCC
- Climate change
