= Estimation of signal parameters via rotational invariance techniques =

Signal processing method

Example of separation into subarrays (2D ESPRIT)

Estimation of signal parameters via rotational invariant techniques (ESPRIT), is a technique to determine the parameters of a mixture of sinusoids in background noise. This technique was first proposed for frequency estimation. However, with the introduction of phased-array systems in everyday technology, it is also used for angle of arrival estimations.

== One-dimensional ESPRIT ==
At instance $t$, the $M$ (complex-valued) output signals (measurements) $y_m[t]$, $m = 1, \ldots, M$, of the system are related to the $K$ (complex-valued) input signals $x_k[t]$, $k = 1, \ldots, K$, as
$$y_m[t] = \sum_{k=1}^K a_{m,k} x_k[t] + n_m[t],$$
where $n_m[t]$ denotes the noise added by the system. The one-dimensional form of ESPRIT can be applied if the weights have the form $a_{m,k} = e^{-j(m-1)\omega_k}$, whose phases are integer multiples of some radial frequency $\omega_k$. This frequency only depends on the index of the system's input, i.e. $k$. The goal of ESPRIT is to estimate $\omega_k$'s, given the outputs $y_m[t]$ and the number of input signals, $K$. Since the radial frequencies are the actual objectives, $a_{m,k}$ is denoted as $a_m(\omega_k)$.

Collating the weights $a_m(\omega_k)$ as $\mathbf a(\omega_k) = [\,1 \,\ e^{-j\omega_k} \,\ e^{-j2\omega_k} \,\ ... \,\ e^{-j(M-1)\omega_k}\,]^\top$ and the $M$ output signals at instance $t$ as $\mathbf y[t] = [\,y_1[t]\,\ y_2[t] \,\ ... \,\ y_M[t]\,]^\top$,
$$\mathbf y[t] = \sum_{k=1}^K \mathbf a(\omega_k) x_k[t] + \mathbf{n}[t],$$
where $\mathbf n[t] = [\,n_1[t]\,\ n_2[t] \,\ ... \,\ n_M[t]\,]^\top$. Further, when the weight vectors $\mathbf a(\omega_1), \ \mathbf a(\omega_2),\ ..., \ \mathbf a(\omega_K)$ are put into a Vandermonde matrix $\mathbf A = [\,\mathbf a(\omega_1) \,\ \mathbf a(\omega_2) \,\ ... \,\ \mathbf a(\omega_K)\,]$, and the $K$ inputs at instance $t$ into a vector $\mathbf x[t] = [\,x_1[t] \,\ ... \,\ x_K[t]\,]^\top$, we can write
$$\mathbf y[t] = \mathbf A\, \mathbf x[t]+\mathbf n[t].$$
With several measurements at instances $t = 1, 2, \dots, T$ and the notations $\mathbf{Y} = [\,\mathbf{y}[1] \,\ \mathbf{y}[2] \,\ \dots \,\ \mathbf{y}[ T ]\,]$, $\mathbf{X} = [\,\mathbf{x}[1] \,\ \mathbf{x}[2] \,\ \dots \,\ \mathbf{x}[ T ]\,]$ and $\mathbf{N} = [\, \mathbf{n}[1] \,\ \mathbf{n}[2] \,\ \dots \,\ \mathbf{n}[ T ]\,]$, the model equation becomes
$$\mathbf{Y} = \mathbf{A} \mathbf{X} + \mathbf{N}.$$

=== Dividing into virtual sub-arrays ===
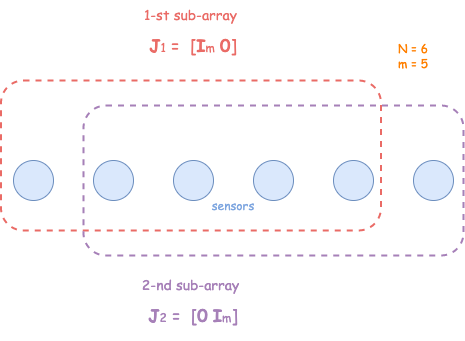
Maximum overlapping of two sub-arrays (N denotes number of sensors in the array, m is the number of sensors in each sub-array, and $J_1$ and $J_2$ are selection matrices)

The weight vector $\mathbf a(\omega_k)$ has the property that adjacent entries are related.
$$[\mathbf{a}(\omega_k)]_{m+1} = e^{-j\omega_k} [\mathbf{a}(\omega_k)]_{m}$$
For the whole vector $\mathbf a(\omega_k)$, the equation introduces two selection matrices $\mathbf{J}_1$and $\mathbf{J}_2$: $\mathbf J_1 = [\mathbf I_{M-1} \quad \mathbf 0]$ and $\mathbf J_2 = [\mathbf 0 \quad \mathbf I_{M-1}]$. Here, $\mathbf I_{M-1}$ is an identity matrix of size $(M-1)$ and $\mathbf 0$ is a vector of $M-1$ zeros.

The vector $\mathbf J_1 \mathbf a(\omega_k)$ $[\mathbf J_2 \mathbf a(\omega_k)]$ contains all elements of $\mathbf a(\omega_k)$ except the last [first] one. Thus, $\mathbf J_2 \mathbf a(\omega_k) = e^{-j\omega_k} \mathbf J_1 \mathbf a(\omega_k)$ and
$$\mathbf J_2 \mathbf A = \mathbf J_1 \mathbf A \mathbf H
,\quad\text{where}\quad
{\mathbf {H}} := \begin{bmatrix} e^{-j\omega_1} &  \\  & e^{-j\omega_2} \\ & & \ddots \\ & & & e^{-j\omega_K} \end{bmatrix}
.$$
The above relation is the first major observation required for ESPRIT. The second major observation concerns the signal subspace that can be computed from the output signals.

=== Signal subspace ===
The singular value decomposition (SVD) of $\mathbf Y$ is given as
$$\mathbf{Y} = \mathbf U \mathbf \Sigma \mathbf V^\dagger$$
where $\mathbf U \in\mathbb C^{M\times M}$ and $\mathbf V \in \mathbb C^{T\times T}$ are unitary matrices and $\mathbf \Sigma$ is a diagonal matrix of size $M \times T$, that holds the singular values from the largest (top left) in descending order. The operator $\dagger$ denotes the complex-conjugate transpose (Hermitian transpose).

Let us assume that $T \geq M$. Notice that we have $K$ input signals. If there was no noise, there would only be $K$ non-zero singular values. We assume that the $K$ largest singular values stem from these input signals and other singular values are presumed to stem from noise. The matrices in the SVD of $\mathbf Y$ can be partitioned into submatrices, where some submatrices correspond to the signal subspace and some correspond to the noise subspace.
$$\begin{aligned}
\mathbf{U} =
\begin{bmatrix}
\mathbf{U}_\mathrm{S} &
\mathbf{U}_\mathrm{N}
\end{bmatrix},
& &
\mathbf{\Sigma} =
\begin{bmatrix}
\mathbf{\Sigma}_\mathrm{S} & \mathbf{0} & \mathbf{0} \\
\mathbf{0} & \mathbf{\Sigma}_\mathrm{N} & \mathbf{0}
\end{bmatrix},
& &
\mathbf{V} =
\begin{bmatrix}
\mathbf{V}_\mathrm{S} &
\mathbf{V}_\mathrm{N} &
\mathbf{V}_\mathrm{0}
\end{bmatrix}
\end{aligned},$$
where $\mathbf{U}_\mathrm{S} \in \mathbb{C}^{M \times K}$ and $\mathbf{V}_\mathrm{S} \in \mathbb{C}^{T \times K}$ contain the first $K$ columns of $\mathbf U$ and $\mathbf V$, respectively and $\mathbf{\Sigma}_\mathrm{S} \in \mathbb{C}^{K \times K}$is a diagonal matrix comprising the $K$ largest singular values.

Thus, The SVD can be written as
$$\mathbf{Y} =  \mathbf U_\mathrm{S} \mathbf \Sigma_\mathrm{S} \mathbf V_\mathrm{S}^\dagger
+ \mathbf U_\mathrm{N} \mathbf \Sigma_\mathrm{N} \mathbf V_\mathrm{N}^\dagger
,$$
where $\mathbf{U}_\mathrm{S}$, ⁣$\mathbf{V}_\mathrm{S}$, and $\mathbf{\Sigma}_\mathrm{S}$ represent the contribution of the input signal $x_k[t]$ to $\mathbf Y$. We term $\mathbf{U}_\mathrm{S}$ the signal subspace. In contrast, $\mathbf{U}_\mathrm{N}$, $\mathbf{V}_\mathrm{ N }$, and $\mathbf{\Sigma}_\mathrm{N}$ represent the contribution of noise $n_m[ t ]$ to $\mathbf Y$.

Hence, from the system model, we can write $\mathbf{A} \mathbf{X} = \mathbf U_\mathrm{S} \mathbf \Sigma_\mathrm{S} \mathbf V_\mathrm{S}^\dagger$ and $\mathbf{N} = \mathbf U_\mathrm{N} \mathbf\Sigma_\mathrm{N} \mathbf V_\mathrm{N}^\dagger$. Also, from the former, we can write
$$\mathbf U_\mathrm{S}
= \mathbf{A} \mathbf{F},$$
where ${\mathbf F } = \mathbf{X} \mathbf V_\mathrm{S} \mathbf \Sigma_\mathrm{S}^{-1}$. In the sequel, it is only important that there exists such an invertible matrix $\mathbf F$ and its actual content will not be important.

Note: The signal subspace can also be extracted from the spectral decomposition of the auto-correlation matrix of the measurements, which is estimated as
$$\mathbf{R}_\mathrm{YY}
=
\frac{1}{T}
\sum_{t=1}^T \mathbf{y}[t] \mathbf{y}[t] ^\dagger
=\frac{1}{T}
\mathbf{Y} \mathbf{Y}^\dagger
=
\frac{1}{T}
\mathbf U
{\mathbf \Sigma \mathbf \Sigma^\dagger}
\mathbf U^\dagger
=
\frac{1}{T}
\mathbf U_\mathrm{S} \mathbf \Sigma_\mathrm{S}^2 \mathbf U_\mathrm{S}^\dagger
+
\frac{1}{T}
\mathbf U_\mathrm{N} \mathbf \Sigma_\mathrm{N}^2 \mathbf U_\mathrm{N}^\dagger.$$

=== Estimation of radial frequencies ===
We have established two expressions so far: $\mathbf J_2 \mathbf A = \mathbf J_1 \mathbf A \mathbf H$ and $\mathbf U_\mathrm{S} = \mathbf{A} \mathbf{F}$. Now,
$$\begin{aligned}
\mathbf J_2 \mathbf A
= \mathbf J_1 \mathbf A \mathbf H
\implies
\mathbf J_2 (\mathbf U_\mathrm{S} \mathbf{F}^{-1})
= \mathbf J_1 (\mathbf U_\mathrm{S} \mathbf{F}^{-1}) \mathbf H
\implies
\mathbf S_2 = \mathbf S_1 \mathbf{P},
\end{aligned}$$
where $\mathbf{S}_1 = \mathbf J_1 \mathbf U_\mathrm{S}$ and $\mathbf{S}_2 = \mathbf J_2 \mathbf U_\mathrm{S}$ denote the truncated signal sub spaces, and
$$\mathbf{P} = \mathbf{F}^{-1} \mathbf H \mathbf{F}.$$
The above equation has the form of an eigenvalue decomposition, and the phases of the eigenvalues in the diagonal matrix $\mathbf H$ are used to estimate the radial frequencies.

Thus, after solving for $\mathbf P$ in the relation $\mathbf S_2 = \mathbf S_1 \mathbf{P}$, we would find the eigenvalues $\lambda_1,\ \lambda_2,\ \ldots,\ \lambda_K$ of $\mathbf P$, where $\lambda_k = \alpha_k \mathrm{e}^{-j \omega_k}$, and the radial frequencies $\omega_1,\ \omega_2,\ \ldots,\ \omega_K$ are estimated as the phases (argument) of the eigenvalues.

Remark: In general, $\mathbf S_1$ is not invertible. One can use the least squares estimate ${\mathbf P} = (\mathbf S_1^\dagger {\mathbf S_1})^{-1} \mathbf S_1^\dagger {\mathbf S_2}$. An alternative would be the total least squares estimate.

=== Algorithm summary ===
Input: Measurements $\mathbf{Y} := [\,\mathbf{y}[1] \,\ \mathbf{y}[2] \,\ \dots \,\ \mathbf{y}[ T ]\,]$, the number of input signals $K$ (estimate if not already known).

1. Compute the singular value decomposition (SVD) of $\mathbf{Y} = \mathbf U \mathbf \Sigma \mathbf V^\dagger$ and extract the signal subspace $\mathbf{U}_\mathrm{S} \in \mathbb{C}^{M \times K}$ as the first $K$ columns of $\mathbf U$.
2. Compute $\mathbf{S}_1 = \mathbf J_1 \mathbf U_\mathrm{S}$ and $\mathbf{S}_2 = \mathbf J_2 \mathbf U_\mathrm{S}$, where $\mathbf J_1 = [\mathbf I_{M-1} \quad \mathbf 0]$ and $\mathbf J_2 = [\mathbf 0 \quad \mathbf I_{M-1}]$.
3. Solve for $\mathbf{P}$ in $\mathbf S_2 = \mathbf S_1 \mathbf{P}$ (see the remark above).
4. Compute the eigenvalues $\lambda_1, \lambda_2, \ldots, \lambda_K$ of $\mathbf{P}$.
5. The phases of the eigenvalues $\lambda_k = \alpha_k \mathrm{e}^{-j \omega_k}$ provide the radial frequencies $\omega_k$, i.e., $\omega_k = -\arg \lambda_k$ .

=== Notes ===
==== Choice of selection matrices ====
In the derivation above, the selection matrices $\mathbf J_1 = [\mathbf I_{M-1} \quad \mathbf 0]$ and $\mathbf J_2 = [\mathbf 0 \quad \mathbf I_{M-1}]$ were used. However, any appropriate matrices $\mathbf J_1$ and $\mathbf{J}_2$ may be used as long as the rotational invariance $($i.e., $\mathbf J_2 \mathbf a(\omega_k) = e^{-j\omega_k} \mathbf J_1 \mathbf a(\omega_k)$$)$, or some generalization of it (see below) holds; accordingly, the matrices $\mathbf J_1 \mathbf A$ and $\mathbf J_2 \mathbf A$ may contain any rows of $\mathbf A$.

==== Generalized rotational invariance ====
The rotational invariance used in the derivation may be generalized. So far, the matrix $\mathbf H$ has been defined to be a diagonal matrix that stores the sought-after complex exponentials on its main diagonal. However, $\mathbf H$ may also exhibit some other structure. For instance, it may be an upper triangular matrix. In this case, $\mathbf{P} = \mathbf{F}^{-1} \mathbf H \mathbf{F}$constitutes a triangularization of $\mathbf P$.

== See also ==
- Multiple signal classification
- Generalized pencil-of-function method
- Independent component analysis
