= Jean-Marc Jancovici =

French engineer and energy climate specialist

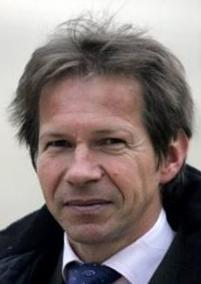
- Born: 13 February 1962 (age 64)

Jean-Marc Jancovici (born 1962) is a French engineering consultant, energy and climate expert, professor, conference speaker, writer, and independent columnist. He is a co-founder and associate at the Carbone 4 consultancy firm, and the founding president of the think-tank The Shift Project.

== Biography ==
He graduated from the École polytechnique in 1984 and from the Ecole nationale supérieure des télécommunications de Paris in 1986.

He is the author and the main developer of the main French carbon accounting method, the Bilan Carbone assessment tool for the French Inter-ministerial Greenhouse Gas Mission.

He collaborated with Nicolas Hulot for 11 years, and co-authored the Pacte écologique, a book that directly led to the Grenelle Environnement during the first years of Nicolas Sarkozy's presidency. He is a member of the SOeS Scientific Committee (MEEDDEM observation and statistics department) and a member of the Fondation Nicolas-Hulot Strategic Committee.

He is the founding president of The Shift Project, a corporate-sponsored think tank established in 2010, which advocates a progressive phase-out of fossil fuels from our economy.

In 2007, he founded the Carbone 4 consultancy with the economist Alain Grandjean. Carbone 4 is a Paris-based consultancy employing around 30 people, which has specialized in adapting human activities (especially economic activities) to any kind of energy constraint (lack of oil, lack of gas, lack of electricity, rising prices, rising constraints on greenhouse gas emissions, new norms or regulations, etc.)

According to him, the current model of Western societies is doomed to decline because it relies on fossil fuels that no alternative could replace identically in terms of quantity or availability. To maintain a certain level of development, he proposes, in particular, focusing on nuclear energy in addition to developing renewable energies (even if he defends the idea of a moratorium on the latter), a proposal that has attracted various criticisms.

He founded two other organisations focused on spreading scientific knowledge about energy and climate change (still active) and is currently chairing the environment section of his alumni association, X Environnement. He teaches first-year students at Mines ParisTech the basics of energy and climate change.

He is a member of the association ASPO France, which studies the oil peak and its consequences.

== Personal life ==
He is married and has two daughters.

He eats little meat, uses public transport, has no cellphone and avoids air travel whenever possible.

== Media, lectures, internet, website ==
He is the author of eight books and has written for several French media outlets (France Info, TF1, Les Échos). His book "Le monde sans fin" is translated into multiple languages.

== Positions ==
Jancovici is a vocal proponent of nuclear energy and advocates making it a dominant energy source. He believes the climate urgency requires closing all coal power plants worldwide within 30 years. He argues that non-nuclear renewable energies will never be sufficient to transition to a carbon-neutral economy.

His positions have been criticized as being overly pro-nuclear, minimizing the dangers of nuclear energy and minimizing the interest in renewable energy.

== Publications ==
- "Le monde sans fin" with Christophe Blain (Dargaud, 2021, ISBN 9782205088168), English translation: "World without end" (Europe Comics, 2022)
- "Dormez tranquilles jusqu'en 2100, et autres malentendus sur le climat et l'énergie" (Odile Jacob, 2015, ISBN 9782738136411)
- "Transition énergétique pour tous" (2011, Odile Jacob, ISBN 9782738129796)
- "C’est maintenant ! 3 ans pour sauver le monde" with Alain Grandjean (Janvier 2009, Le Seuil, ISBN 9782020987684)
- "Le changement climatique expliqué à ma fille" (Janvier 2009, Le Seuil, ISBN 9782021365740)
- "Le Plein s’il vous plaît" with Alain Grandjean (Le Seuil, Février 2006, ISBN 9782020857925)
- "L'effet de serre, allons-nous changer le climat ?" with Hervé Le Treut (Flammarion, 2004, ISBN 9782080300201)
- "L'avenir climatique, quel temps ferons-nous ?" (Le Seuil, 2002, ISBN 9782020788182)
