= Pavlina R. Tcherneva =

American economist

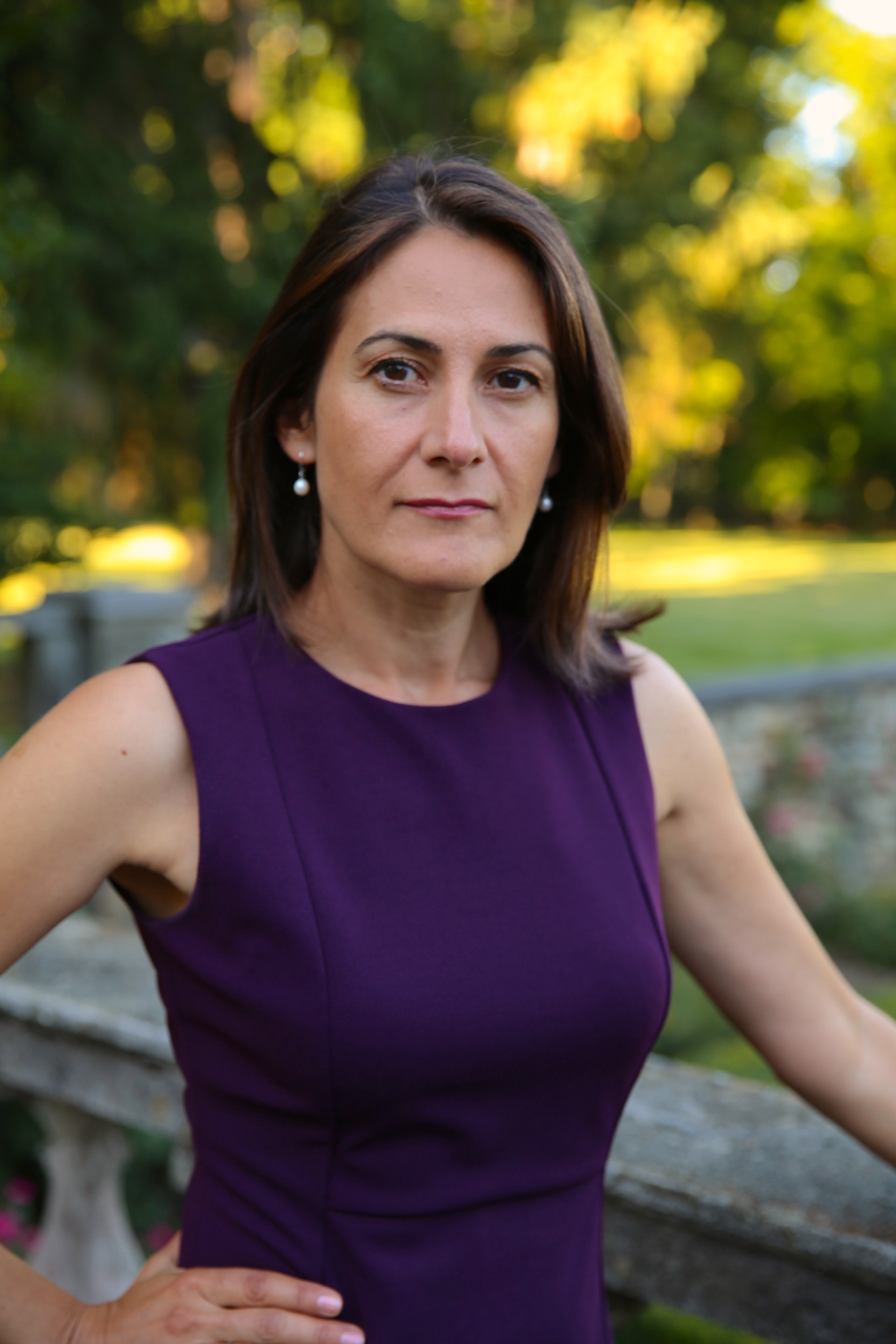
- Levy Economics Institute President, Pavlina R. Tcherneva

Academic background
- Education: Gettysburg College; University of Missouri-Kansas City
- Influences: John Maynard Keynes; Hyman Minsky; Abba Lerner

Academic work
- Discipline: Public economics; Modern monetary theory; Unemployment
- School or tradition: Post Keynesian economics
- Institutions: President, Levy Economics Institute of Bard College Professor of Economics Bard College Director, OSUN Economic Democracy Initiative
- Website: Information at IDEAS / RePEc

Pavlina R. Tcherneva is an American economist, of Bulgarian descent, working as associate professor of economics at Bard College. She is President of the Levy Economics Institute and expert at the Institute for New Economic Thinking.

== Education ==
Tcherneva studied economics and mathematics at Gettysburg College, Pennsylvania, obtaining her B.A. with honors in both, in 1997. She obtained her Master's degree in Economics at the University of Missouri-Kansas City, in 2004, where she also defended her Economics and Social Science Ph.D. dissertation in 2008.

== Career ==
Tcherneva has taught at the Franklin and Marshall College and the University of Missouri-Kansas City. During 2000–2006, she served as the associate director for economic analysis at the Center for Full Employment and Price Stability, where she remains a senior research associate. In summer 2006, she was a visiting scholar at the University of Cambridge's Centre for Economic and Public Policy, in the United Kingdom, and since July 2007, she's a research scholar at the Levy Economics Institute.

Tcherneva's work is on macroeconomics issues, where she is conducting research in the field of fiscal policy, with a focus on full employment. She is a notable proponent of modern monetary theory and the notion of a job guarantee. Her research on monetary and fiscal policies, specifically under sovereign currency regimes and the macroeconomic effects of alternative stabilization programs, including both the Reinvestment Act (ARRA) and responses from the Federal Reserve's policy during the Great Recession have appeared in the Review of Social Economy, Journal of Post Keynesian Economics, and International Journal of Political Economy, in addition to other publications. She has also collaborated with policymakers from various countries, including the United States, on developing job-creation programs.

== Selected works ==
- Forstater, Mathew & Tcherneva, P. (editors) Full Employment and Price Stability: The Macroeconomic Vision of William S. Vickrey, Elgar, 2004, ISBN 9781843764090
- Tcherneva, Pavlina. "Chartalism and the tax-driven approach" in Philip Arestis & Malcolm C. Sawyer, A handbook of alternative monetary economics. Cheltenham: Edward Elgar, 2006
- Tcherneva, Pavlina. "The Nature, Origins, and Role of Money: Broad and Specific Propositions and Their Implications for Policy" Center for Full Employment and Price Stability, University of Missouri-Kansas City, July 2005
- Tcherneva, Pavlina R. (2010). "Fiscal Policy: The Wrench in the New Economic Consensus". International Journal of Political Economy. 39 (3): 24–44. doi:10.2753/IJP0891-1916390302. JSTOR 23032385. S2CID 154815524.
- Tcherneva, Pavlina R. (2020). The Case for a Job Guarantee. Polity. ISBN 978-1-509-54210-9.

== See also ==
- Income inequality in the United States
