= Hervé Le Treut =

French climatologist

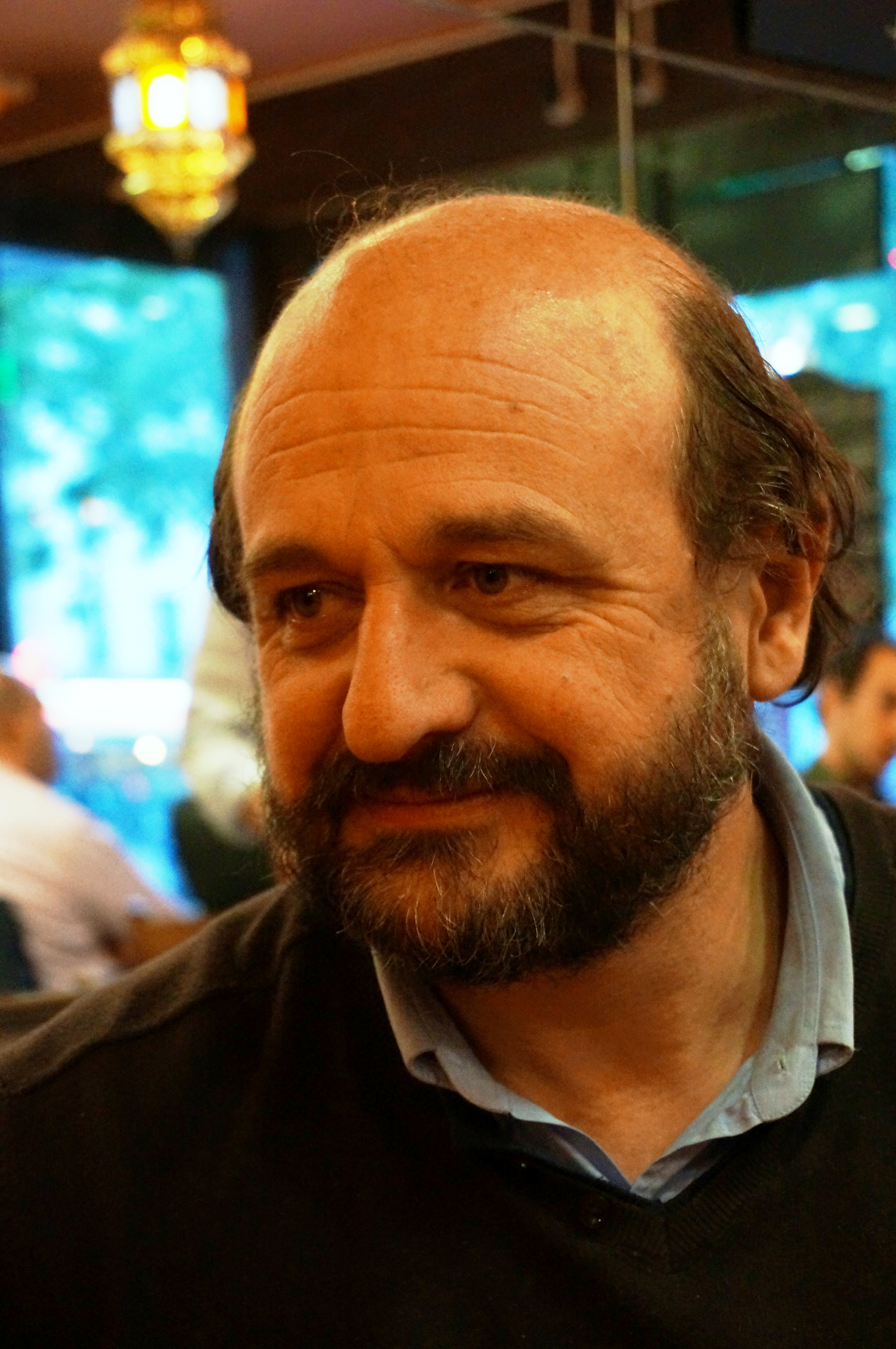
- Hervé Le Treut in 2013
- Born: 18 June 1956 (age 70); Toulon, France
- Education: École normale supérieure
- Occupation: Climatologist

Hervé Le Treut (born 18 June 1956 in Toulon), is a French climatologist specialized in climate numerical simulation. He is member of the French Academy of Sciences and Intergovernmental Panel on Climate Change and was director of the Pierre-Simon-Laplace Institute (2008-2019).

== Education ==
He entered the École normale supérieure in 1976, and in 1978 began a doctoral thesis on cloud modelling in the climate system, which he will support in 1985. At the same time, he has been working on past climate modelling with Michael Ghil.

== Scientific career ==
Hervé Le Treut has much contributed to the understanding of what is involved in the climate change: interaction between ocean and atmosphere, water cycle effect, and also biochemical effects. He also studied human influence in the greenhouse effect. His work has given rise to some one hundred publications.

His expertise has earned him membership of the Intergovernmental Panel on Climate Change (IPCC). In 2003, he argued that stabilizing the climate system changes would mean “we would need to cut by a factor two or three the global emissions of greenhouse gases”, if not of carbon.

He is also invited by mass media on a regular basis to talk about the role of human activity in global warming. In November 2009, he published a new book New Climate on Earth: Understanding, Predicting, Responding (in French, ed. Flammarion). In this book, he predicts that due to CO_{2} emissions “well beyond the worst case scenario” considered by IPCC projections, a rise in temperatures between 4 and 6 degrees by the end of the century, depending on the selected model. The Copenhague conference failure on the same year made him say that “if we do nothing, the critical threshold of a temperature rise of 2°C will be overshoot by 2050.”

Alongside his research and management activities at the IPSL (Pierre Simon Laplace Institute), Hervé Le Treut is now Professor of Mechanics and Environment Physics at the École polytechnique and Pierre and Marie Curie University. He also taught climate dynamics at the École normale supérieure and Sciences Po.

He is a member of the French Academy of Sciences since 29 November 2005.

== Awards and honours ==
- CNRS Bronze Medal (1990)
- Philip Morris Price (1992)
- Becquerel Price awarded by the French Academy of Sciences (1994)
- Member of the Academia Europaea (1999)
- Dargelos Price awarded by the École Polytechnique Alumni Association (2004)
- Member of the French Academy of Sciences (2005)
- Chevalier of the French Légion d'honneur (2011)
- Palmes académiques (2011)
