= Boolean delay equation =

A Boolean Delay Equation (BDE) is an evolution rule for the state of dynamical variables whose values may be represented by a finite discrete numbers or states, such as 0 and 1. As a novel type of semi-discrete dynamical systems, Boolean delay equations (BDEs) are models with Boolean-valued variables that evolve in continuous time. Since at the present time, most phenomena are too complex to be modeled by partial differential equations (as continuous infinite-dimensional systems), BDEs are intended as a (heuristic) first step on the challenging road to further understanding and modeling them. For instance, one can mention complex problems in fluid dynamics, climate dynamics, solid-earth geophysics, and many problems elsewhere in natural sciences where much of the discourse is still conceptual.

One example of a BDE is the Ring oscillator equation: X(t-τ) = X̅(t), which produces periodic oscillations. More complex equations can display richer behavior, such as nonperiodic and chaotic (deterministic) behavior.
