= Jean-Pascal van Ypersele =

Belgian climatologist (born 1957)

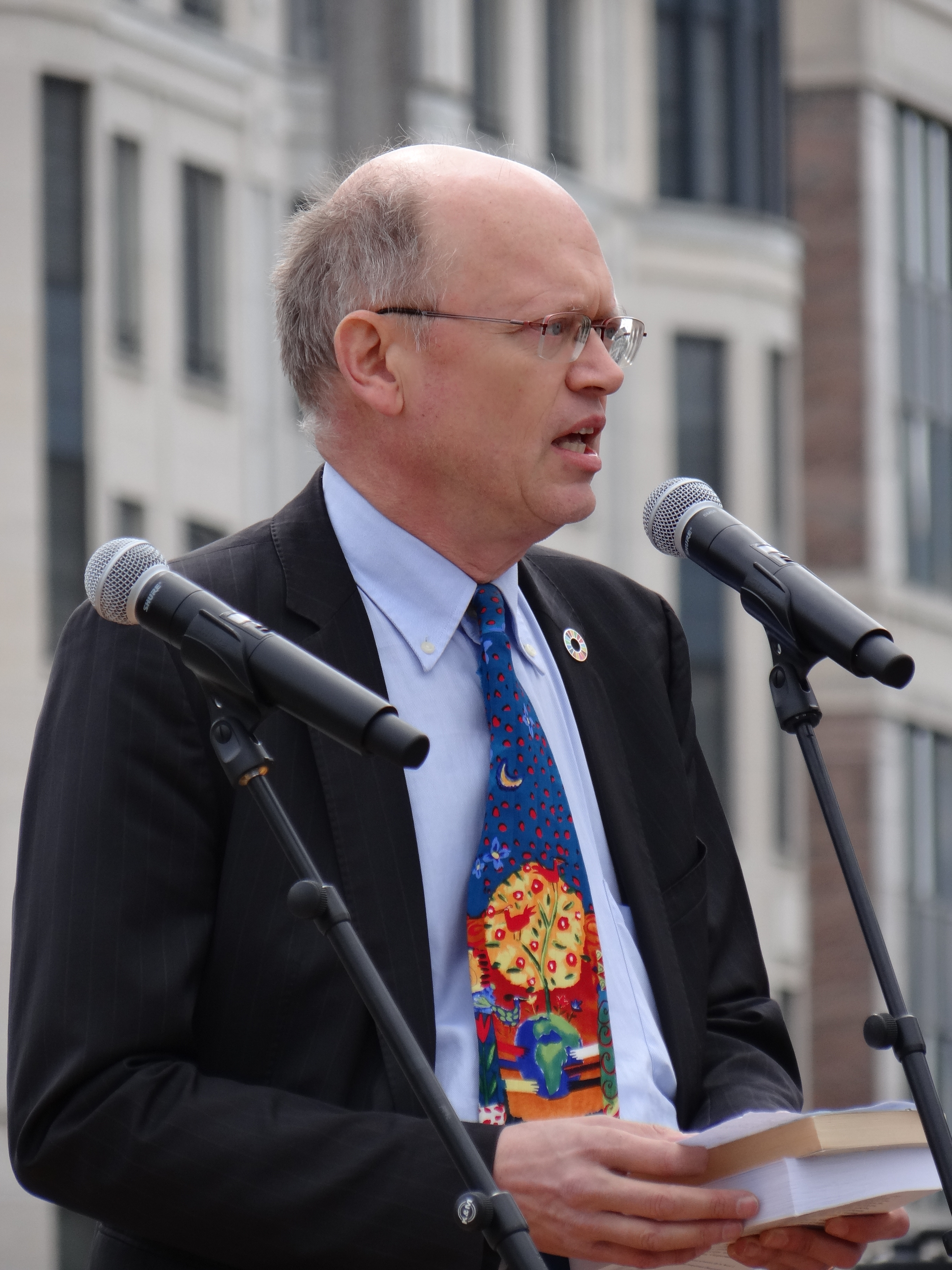
- Born: 14 April 1957 (age 69); Brussels, Belgium
- Education: UCLouvain; National Center for Atmospheric Research
- Scientific career
- Fields: Physics, Climatology
- Workplaces: UCLouvain

Jean-Pascal van Ypersele de Strihou (born 1957) is a Belgian academic climatologist. He is a professor of Environmental Sciences at the UCLouvain (Belgium). As a previous vice-chair of the IPCC, Van Yp (as he is called by his peers) is one of the forerunners of climate change mitigation through strong decrease of fossil fuel consumption.

== Quote ==
"The debate has shifted from a scientific one 40 years ago to a very political one today, involving economic interests, geopolitics, different priorities given to environment or development, and a clash between short-term and long-term visions." (2015).

== Biography ==
=== Early life ===
Van Ypersele was born in Brussels in 1957.

Astronomy was his youth passion. Aged ten, he built his first telescopes with gutter scrap and lenses that he got from opticians in Brussels. Twelve years old, he was an assiduous reader of Sky & Telescope. In 1971 he became secretary of the amateur Cercle Astronomique de Bruxelles club, which put him into contact with professional astronomists. On 30 June 1973 he was part of an international team of astronomists that travelled to Kenya to observe the longest solar eclipse of the 20th century.

=== Studies ===
- Master in physics at the UCLouvain
- Internship on climate and desertification in Nairobi at the United Nations Environment Programme (UNEP)
- Master thesis on the effect of CO_{2} on the climate

=== Ancillary activities as a student ===
As a university student, van Ypersele had an important social involvement

- member of Inter-Environnement, he was influenced by the concepts of the 1972 United Nations Conference on the Human Environment in Stockholm
- co-founder of an Amnesty International branch in Louvain-la-Neuve
- member of Mouvement des Jeunes pour la Paix
- activist against apartheid in South Africa and right extremism
- organised a meeting between UCLouvain students and Claude Cheysson, European Commissioner for Development cooperation

=== Academic career ===
Van Ypersele carried out a PhD research in climatology. At the initiative of professor André Berger the Institut d’Astronomie et de Géophysique Georges Lemaître of the UCLouvain had started to study the impacts of changes in concentration of greenhouse gasses on the evolution of the Earth's climate. In and outside Europe, research on the effects of human activities on the climate produced its first results.

van Ypersele received a PhD in physics from UCLouvain in 1986 (with highest honours), with his dissertation on his work done at the United States National Center for Atmospheric Research (NCAR) on the effect of global warming on Antarctic sea ice. The choice for the National Center for Atmospheric Research was related to its large available technological means for atmospheric science research. At the NCAR he worked with climatologist Stephen Schneider. Promoters of his PhD were professors André Berger (UCLouvain) and Albert Semtner (National Center for Atmospheric Research and Naval Postgraduate School in the United States), one of the developers of the Modular Ocean Model.

At the UCLouvain, van Ypersele became professor of climatology and environmental sciences. He further specialised in the numerical simulation of climate change in an interdisciplinary perspective, and has worked at global and regional scales. He is particularly interested in the effect of human activities on climate, the impact of climate variability and change on ecosystems and human activities, and what can be done about it (adaptation and mitigation).

van Ypersele authored papers on subjects on a plethora of issues, including the modeling of sea ice, palaeoclimates, the climate of the 20th and 21st century, regional climate change in Europe, Greenland, and Africa, and the ethical issues associated with responsibility for climate change.

== Teaching ==
Jean-Pascal van Ypersele teaches courses at the UCLouvain

- Climatology
- Climate modelling
- Mathematical geography
- Environmental science

== IPCC ==
=== Pionieering work ===
In 1979, ten years before the establishment of the IPCC, he took part, as a 22-year-old student, in the First World Climate Conference in Geneva, organized by the World Meteorological Organisation (WMO) and the United Nations.

In November 1995, he participated in his first IPCC meeting (the Intergovernmental Panel on Climate Change, that investigates climate change on Earth) in Madrid, as sole Belgian representative. He contributed to a short sentence that entered in the annals of the organisation: The balance of evidence suggests that there is a discernible human influence on global climate. This statement is crucial, as it mentions clearly for the first time that a worrying climate evolution is ongoing; it is demonstrated and no longer a theoretical projection of the future.

=== Climate summits ===
He developed his qualities as negotiator at about all Conferences of the Parties (COP) of the United Nations Framework Convention on Climate Change, for over 20 years. At such climate summits the Belgian delegation strongly benefited from the scientific advice and dedication of prof van Ypersele.

Jean-Pascal van Ypersele was one of the lead authors of the Third Assessment Report of the IPPC in 2001.

He was elected as a member of the IPCC Bureau in 2002.

He has several times filled in as a Review Editor of the Assessment Reports en Special Reports of the IPCC.

He was member of the core writing team for the Synthesis Report of the 5th Assessment Report in 2014.

He was one of IPCC Vice-Chairs during the 5th cycle of evaluation, from September 2008 to October 2015.

He was nominated by the Belgian government as candidate to the IPCC Chair position in 2015, but not elected.

He remains an active member of IPCC and contributes strongly to the development and dissemination of its scientific message. He established the Walloon platform for the IPCC, with the assistance of the Walloon government in Belgium to facilitate contacts between the IPCC, the scientific world and politicians. He was appointed by UNESCO to be part of a group of experts tasked with drafting a Declaration on Ethical Principles in relation to Climate Change (approved by the UNESCO assembly in November 2017). The UN Secretary General appointed him in 2016 as a member of a 15-member group of scientists tasked with the preparation of the first quadrennial Global Sustainable Development Report. In 2017, he was appointed as a member of the high-level Advisory Group for the COP23 Presidency by the Fiji Prime Minister.

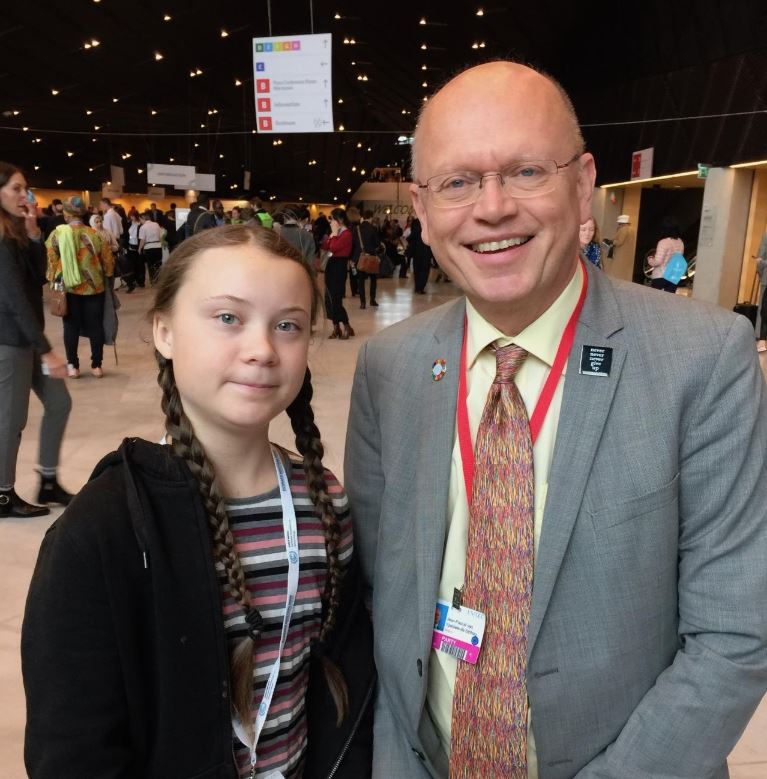
Jean-Pascal van Ypersele and Greta Thunberg at the COP24 in Katowice in 2018

He endeavours to demonstrate the operation of climate confusers and of the fossil fuels lobby.

=== Diplomacy and persuasion ===
He participates in numerous events related to climate change – personally or virtually – thanks to his lectures and networks. All over the world. One day he is in Lima, Geneva or Marrakesh. The next day he may talk in Brussels for an auditorium filled with students or trade unionists. Two days later he addresses senior staff of a multinational bank, European bishops or a group of freemasons.

=== Candidacy as IPCC chair in 2015 ===
In 2014 van Ypersele was nominated by the Belgian government as candidate to take over IPCC-chair from Rajendra Pachauri in 2015. For 20 months, he travelled around the world to present an elaborate programme to decision makers, scientists, industrialists and journalists. His aim was to increase the influence of the IPCC.

The elections of IPCC Bureau members (chair, Vice-Chairs, and Working Group and TFI Co-Chairs and Vice-Chairs) were held during the 42nd IPCC Session from 5 to 8 October 2015, in Dubrovnik. Despite the assistance and official support of the Belgian government, his campaign pledge to maintain the scientific independence of the IPCC, and his stressing of the importance of inclusiveness and communication, Jean-Pascal van Ypersele was not elected. He lost in the final round against Hoesung Lee with 56 votes to 78.

As his mandate as a vice-president had run out, he was no longer a member of the IPCC bureau. He continued participating in the IPCC plenary sessions as a representative of the Belgian delegation.

On 2 April 2019 he announced that he would again apply for the IPCC presidency.

== Main publications ==
=== PhD thesis ===
- A Numerical Study of the Response of the Southern Ocean and Its Sea Ice to a CO_{2}-Induced Atmospheric Warming, National Center for Atmospheric Research and Université catholique de Louvain, Boulder (USA) and Louvain-la-Neuve, 1986.

=== Books ===
- In het oog van de klimaatstorm [in Dutch], Epo, Berchem, 2018
- Meeting report of the IPCC Expert Meeting on Communication. Geneva: World Meteorological Organization, IPCC, 2016.
- Une vie au cœur des turbulences climatiques [in French], Bruxelles, De Boeck supérieur, 2015, 128 p.
- IPCC, 2014: Climate Change 2014: Synthesis Report. Contribution of Working Groups I, II and III to the Fifth Assessment Report of the Intergovernmental Panel on Climate Change [lid redactieraad]. IPCC, Geneva, Switzerland, 151 pp.
- van Ypersele, J-P. & Hudon, M. (eds.), Actes du 1er Congrès interdisciplinaire du développement durable : quelle transition pour nos sociétés ? [in French], 6 volumes, Service Public de Wallonie, 2013.
- Climate change and the Belgian development cooperation policy: challenges and opportunities, FPS Foreign Affairs, Foreign Trade and Development Cooperation and Université catholique de Louvain, Brussel, 2008.
- Le Treut, H., J.P. van Ypersele, S. Hallegatte et J.C. Hourcade (ed.), Science du changement climatique – Acquis et controverses [in French], IDDRI, Paris, 2004.

=== Articles in scientific journals ===
- 2014. Comparison of one-moment and two-moment bulk microphysics for high-resolution climate simulations of intense precipitation: Atmos. Research
- 2010. The impact of the unilateral EU commitment on the stability of international climate agreements: Climate Policy
- 2009. Assessing dangerous climate change through an update of the Intergovernmental Panel on Climate Change (IPCC) "reasons for concern": Proc. Natl. Acad. Sci. USA
- 2009. PRIMES scenario analysis towards 2030 for Belgium: European Review of Energy Markets, Energy Policy Studies
- 2008. Internal variability in a regional climate model over West Africa: Clim. Dyn.
- 2007. The 1979-2005 Greenland ice sheet melt extent from passive microwave data using an improved version of the melt retrieval XPGR algorithm: Geophys. Res. Lett.
- 2006. L'injustice fondamentale des changements climatiques [in French]: Alternatives Sud
- 2006. The 1988-2003 Greenland ice sheet melt extent using passive microwave satellite data and a regional climate model: Clim. Dyn.
- 2002. Are natural climate forcings able to counteract the projected anthropogenic global warming?: Clim. Change
- 2001. Managing climate risk: Science
- 2000. Nous empruntons la Terre aux enfants d'aujourd'hui et de demain [in French]: Lumen Vitae
- 1999. Potential role of solar variability as an agent for climate change: Clim. Change
- 1999. Volcanic and solar impacts on climate since 1700: Clim. Dyn.
- 1992. Simulation of the Last Glacial Cycle By a Coupled, Sectorially Averaged Climate-ice Sheet Model. 2. Response To Insolation and CO_{2} Variations: J. Geophys. Res.-Atmos.
- 1991. Simulation of the Last Glacial Cycle By a Coupled, Sectorially Averaged Climate-ice Sheet Model.1. The Climate Model: J. Geophys. Res.-Atmos.
- 1986. Climate and Desertification – Editorial, in van Ypersele J.P. & M. Verstraete (eds), Climate and Desertification Special Issue: Climatic Change

=== Book chapters ===
- 2012. Comment le GIEC gère-t-il les incertitudes scientifiques? [in French]
- 2008. The fundamental injustice of climate change
- 2006. The Relationships Between Population and Environment
- 2004. A few, ou comment affaiblir un texte du GIEC [in French]
- 2002. The Kyoto Protocol: an economic and game-theoretic interpretation

== Involvement with the society ==
Since 1993, he is a member of the Belgian Federal Council for Sustainable Development, and since 1998 he chairs its Working Group on Energy and Climate.

From July to December 2001, he was scientific advisor for climate affairs with the Belgian Presidency of the Council of the European Union.

In 2005, he was appointed as member of the "Energy 2030" commission (advising the Belgian government on energetic transition).

From 2008 to 2011, he was the chair of the scientific committee of the world's largest exhibition (SOS-Planet) on climate change in the Liège-Guillemins railway station.

In 2011, he co-organised the First Stephen Schneider Symposium (Boulder, Colorado, US). In 2013, he co-chaired the First interdisciplinary Symposium on Sustainable Development in Namur (Belgium), and co-chaired its second edition in 2015 in Louvain-la-Neuve (Belgium). He personally briefed several heads of state, many ministers and CEOs about climate issues, and has been or is member of several international scientific advisory or editorial boards (EU FP7 Research Programme, Dutch Climate Research Programme, Météo-France, EU JPI-Climate TAB, Royal Meteorological Institute (Belgium), the leading journal Climatic Change , established by Stephen Schneider).

In 2019 he became member of a think tank of climate experts that was established in synergy with the climate strikes of the Belgian Youth For Climate, in which secondary school students left classes to demonstrate in favour of measures against climate change. Throughout 2019 he appeared as an assiduous supporter of the young activists.

In 2019 he was appointed as an expert with the EU Horizon 2020 Mission Board for Adaptation to Climate Change, including Societal Transformation.

== Awards and honours ==
- 2006: Energy and Environment Award of the International Polar Foundation
- 2007: Nobel Peace Prize, awarded to Al Gore and the IPCC (van Ypersele was vice-president of IPCC's working group II)
- 2008: Francqui-Chair at the Université libre de Bruxelles
- 2009: Member of the Royal Academy of Belgium
- 2010: Honorary member of the Club of Rome (EU Chapter)
- 2011: Francqui-Chair at the KULeuven and HUBrussel
- 2011: Commander of the Mérite wallon
- 2014: Grand Officer in the Order of the Crown (Belgium)
- 2018: Leadership Prize by the Harvard Club of Belgium

== Renown ==
Van Ypersele has delivered hundreds of lectures and has given more than a thousand interviews in international media; he has almost 14000 followers on Twitter, which puts him among the 50 top world climate scientists on Twitter.

He has been featured in a ministry examination for the secondary 5 level in the Quebec province, Canada. Which had sparked controversy over a question on the exam resulting in a widespread of rage from the students of Quebec.

In a 2018 Associated Press interview, van Ypersele urged that "countries should do everything possible to work towards the report's goal of reining in carbon emissions by 2030, at which point scientists say damage to the climate will be irreversible unless urgent action has been taken." He added, "Nobody, even the so-called superpowers, can negotiate with the laws of physics."

== Controversy ==
Van Ypersele's work is sometimes challenged by “climate confusers”; there was a petition signed by eight Belgian academics and opinion makers opposing his candidacy as IPCC chair in 2015. Most known of these opponents is his colleague from UCLouvain, Professor István Markó who produced a large scientific output in the field of organic chemistry, but not climatology.

== See also ==
- List of climate scientists

== Sources ==
- Jean-Pascal van Ypersele
- More information about the candidature of Jean-Pascal van Ypersele to the position of Chair of the IPCC
