= Natural Language Semantics Markup Language =

Meaning from natural language inputs

Natural Language Semantics Markup Language is a XML- based markup language for providing systems (like Voice Browsers) with semantic interpretations for a variety of inputs, including speech and natural language text input. Natural Language Semantics Markup Language is currently a World Wide Web Consortium Working Draft. It was developed by W3C Voice Browser Working Group.

The purpose of NLSML is to give a standardized way to capture the 'meaning' from natural language inputs, so said information is usable by other components from a larger system.

There are multiple aspects to a user's speech like the 'result', 'interpretation', 'model', and 'instance'. The 'result' aspect is a result from one or more 'interpretation' aspects, which arise from estimation in determining the meaning of a users speech. The 'model' aspect, has the XForms data model, which provides a data model containing multiple goals. The 'instance' aspect refers to an instance of XForms data model. In other words, the 'instance' aspect is concrete example of the XForms data model. Lastly, the 'input' aspect refers to, as one can infer, the user's input.

== See also ==
- VoiceXML
- SRGS
- Semantic Interpretation for Speech Recognition
