= SSML =

SSML is an acronym, which may stand for:

- Speech Synthesis Markup Language, an XML-based markup language for speech synthesis applications.
- Spartan South Midlands League, a football league in England.
- Ship and Offshore Structural Mechanics Laboratory, National Research Laboratory funded by the Korea Science and Engineering Foundation.
