= Voice browser =

Interactive voice user interface

A voice browser is a software application that presents an interactive voice user interface to the user in a manner analogous to the functioning of a web browser interpreting Hypertext Markup Language (HTML). Dialog documents interpreted by voice browser are often encoded in standards-based markup languages, such as Voice Dialog Extensible Markup Language (VoiceXML), a standard by the World Wide Web Consortium.

A voice browser presents information aurally, using pre-recorded audio file playback or text-to-speech synthesis software. A voice browser obtains information using speech recognition and keypad entry, such as DTMF detection.

As speech recognition and web technologies have matured, voice applications are deployed commercially in many industries and voice browsers are supplanting traditional proprietary interactive voice response (IVR) systems. Voice browser software is delivered in a variety of implementations models.

Systems that present a voice browser to a user, typically provide interfaces to the public switched telephone network or to a private branch exchange.

== See also ==
- Call Control eXtensible Markup Language (CCXML)
- Speech Recognition Grammar Specification (SRGS)
- Semantic Interpretation for Speech Recognition (SISR)
- Speech Synthesis Markup Language (SSML)
- Pronunciation Lexicon Specification (PLS)
- ECMAScript – Scripting language supported by most voice browsers
