= Call Control eXtensible Markup Language =

XML standard

Call Control eXtensible Markup Language (CCXML) is an XML standard designed to provide asynchronous event-based telephony support to VoiceXML. Its current status is a W3C recommendation, adopted May 10, 2011. Whereas VoiceXML is designed to provide a Voice User Interface to a voice browser, CCXML is designed to inform the voice browser how to handle the telephony control of the voice channel. The two XML applications are wholly separate and are not required by each other to be implemented - however, they have been designed with interoperability in mind

== Status and Future ==
- CCXML 1.0 has reached the status of a Proposed Recommendation. The transition from Candidate Recommendation to Proposed Recommendation took 1 year, while the transition from Last Call Working Draft to Candidate Recommendation took just over 3 years.
- As CCXML extensively uses the concepts of events and transitions, it is expected that the state machines used in the next CCXML 2.0 version will take advantage of a new XML State Machine notation called SCXML, however SCXML is still in Working Draft.

== Implementations ==
- OptimTalk is an application platform providing a wide range of technologies and tools for managing, processing and automation of voice communication. It contains a media server supporting VoiceXML 2.0/2.1, CCXML, MRCPv2 and SIP. Besides these open standards, it further supports SRGS, SISR, SSML, HTTP(S), SOAP, REST and SNMP. OptimTalk also serves as a versatile platform for computer telephony integration (CTI) and provides instant access to speech technologies. It is available for Windows, Linux and Solaris, 32 and 64 bit.
- Oktopous ccXML Browser is a first Linux-based comprehensive ccXML lightweight tool kit, that conforms to the Working Draft spec of CCXML 1.0 published in April 2010. Oktopous enables developers to take advantage of well-known Web technologies and tools when building their telephony and speech applications. The Oktopous Engine powers over 5 million calls daily, and is free to download and integrate before going live.
- Voxeo Prophecy IVR Platform is a full IVR platform combining CCXML, VoiceXML and several other technologies. Voxeo has 32-bit and 64-bit distributions for Windows, Mac OS X, and Linux. Prophecy is free for up to 2 ports.
- Telesoft Technologies ARNE IVR Platform is a complete IVR platform, used in value added service and customer service applications. Combines CCXML, VoiceXML with MRCP, HTTP(s) interfaces and connects to Internet Protocol, fixed telephony and mobile phone telecoms networks using SIP, VOIP, SS7/PSTN and other telecoms protocols. Supports multi-tenant applications.
- Open Source Oktopous PIK an abstract, C++ implementation of the W3C Call Control XML (ccXML) standard. Licensed under a BSD-Style license, the toolkit is independent of the underlying telephony platform and protocols and is best suited for OEM / System Integrators looking to implement ccXML functionality in their product offerings. Originally developed by Phonologies, Oktopous has been adopted by more telephony platforms than any open-source ccXML Browser.
- CCXML4J a CCXML Interpreter in Java according to the W3C specification. It is independent of the telephony infrastructure and provides mechanisms to integrate with telephony APIs, e.g. based on the JAIN specifications. This is a derivative of Open Source Oktopous PIK.
- ADVOSS SDP AdvOSS offers the Programmable, Extensible and Enhanceable Service Delivery Platform to enable developers to build and deploy feature rich SIP applications using the industry standard Call Control XML (CCXML), for rapid development and deployment of new services. AdvOSS SDP is a Programmable Extensible and Enhanceable platform that uses industry-standard CCXML. For AdvOSS, making the platform programmable and enhanceable made much sense as the whole idea behind using an SDP is to attain the advantage of developing and integrating new services into the system at a brisk pace. Therefore, we believe that our customer should have the capacity to program, extend and enhance the different modules of this application to meet the rapidly growing requirements of their customers. The service delivery platform has been built from ground up to enable developers to build and deploy feature-rich SIP applications using Call Control XML (CCXML). CCXML provides simple primitives, allowing users to write applications enabling them to quickly transform ideas to solutions. In addition, the AdvOSS platform extends CCXML to support primitives for Authentication, Authorization and Accounting (AAA) allowing applications to interface with billing systems either directly or through RADIUS.
- HP OCMP HP OCMP offers a carrier grade, large scale highly available voice/video platforms supporting a wide variety of standards. Integration with SMSC, LDAP, JDBC, SOAP, UCIP, XCAP and CDR processing connectivity is possible.

== See also ==
- VoiceXML
- SCXML
- MSML, MSCML: markup languages to control telephony media servers.
