= Samaritans Radar =

Former Twitter-based service

Logo of Samaritans Radar service

Samaritans Radar was a Twitter-based service created by the digital advertising agency Jam for the British emotional support charity Samaritans. It was intended as a way to inform users when their Twitter contacts were potentially in need of emotional support. The app scanned Twitter for key phrases such as "help me", "hate myself", mentions of being depressed or needing someone to talk to and then sent an email to that user's friends. Samaritans suspended the Radar service following widespread criticism and a petition asking the charity to discontinue the service.

Samaritans noted as justification for building the app that there is a link between posting suicidal messages on social media services and committing suicide, and that social media services are used predominantly by younger people.

== Reception ==
Many Twitter users expressed concerns about Radar, arguing that it infringed privacy, that tweets were scanned and collected without consent, and the app allowed bullies, stalkers and internet trolls to target their victims when they were at their most vulnerable. According to the BBC, the majority of tweets using the hashtag #SamaritansRadar were negative. A Change.org petition was launched to ask Twitter to shut Radar down and a number of complaints were sent to the Information Commissioner's Office claiming that the app breached the Data Protection Act.

In response to critics, Samaritans allowed users to be "whitelisted", meaning that their tweets would not be scanned by the app. This required sending a direct message on Twitter to be opted out. The service had been activated by 3,000 users as of 4 November 2014.

== Suspension ==
Following this extensive criticism, the service was suspended on 7 November 2014, nine days after being launched. In March 2015 it was announced that the app had been permanently closed and all associated data had been deleted.

== See also ==
- Sentiment analysis
