= SABLE =

XML markup language

SABLE is an XML markup language used to annotate texts for speech synthesis. It defines tags that control how written words, numbers, and sentences are audibly reproduced by a computer. SABLE was developed as an informal joint project between Sun Microsystems, AT&T, Bell Labs, and the University of Edinburgh (the initial letters of each make the word "SABLE") as an initiative to combine three previous speech synthesis markup languages SSML, STML, and JSML.

SABLE is used in the Festival Speech Synthesis System.

Development on SABLE appears to have stopped in 2010, and it has not reached the status of a formal standard or recommended specification.
