= InkML =

XML-based markup language

Ink Markup Language (InkML)
- Filename extension: .ink, .inkml
- Internet media type: application/inkml+xml
- Type code: 'TEXT'

InkML is an XML-based markup language to describe "ink" data input with an electronic pen or stylus. The recommended specification was published by the World Wide Web Consortium (W3C) in September 2011.

It is part of the W3C Multimodal Interaction Activity initiative.

== Software ==
InkML Toolkit
- Developer(s): HP Labs
- Initial release: 2008; 17 years ago
- Stable release: 0.5.0 / July 8, 2008; 17 years ago
- Repository: sourceforge.net/projects/inkmltk/
- Type: Software library
- License: MIT License
- Website: inkmltk.sourceforge.net

InkML Toolkit (InkMLTk) is targeted at providing a suite of tools for working with InkML documents. The toolkit includes the following libraries and tools,

- InkML processor libraries implementing the W3C InkML specification
- Converters library and tools (to and from other ink and image formats)
- InkML viewers as browser plug-ins, and
- InkML applications such as a graphical editor.

This project is released on SourceForge as an open source contribution from HP Labs, India.

== See also ==
- Ink Serialized Format
- Tablet computer
