= JSGF =

JSGF stands for Java Speech Grammar Format or the JSpeech Grammar Format (in a W3C Note). Developed by Sun Microsystems, it is a textual representation of grammars for use in speech recognition for technologies like XHTML+Voice. JSGF adopts the style and conventions of the Java programming language in addition to use of traditional grammar notations.

The Speech Recognition Grammar Specification was derived from this specification.

== Example ==
The following JSGF grammar will recognize the words coffee, tea, and milk.

#JSGF V1.0;
   
grammar numbers;
    
public <drinks> = coffee | tea | milk;

== See also ==
- SRGS
- XHTML+Voice
