= MSCML =

The Media Server Control Markup Language (MSCML) is a protocol used in conjunction with the Session Initiation Protocol (SIP) to enable the delivery of advanced multimedia conferencing services over IP networks. The MSCML specification has been published by the IETF under RFC 4722, now obsoleted by the newer RFC 5022. MSCML was pioneered by the media server company Snowshore, now part of the Dialogic Corporation. MSCML built on ideas from the Netann protocol, and in turn inspired the MSML. An IETF working group called MediaCTRL (media control) have now embarked on a standardization of media server scripting languages, drawing on these earlier efforts. Voice scripting protocols like VoiceXML and CCXML are also inspiring sources, and in some cases need to be integrated with what media servers will need to operate in the real world.

MSCML enables enhanced conference control functions such as muting individual callers or legs in a multi-party conference call. Other control functionality enabled by MSCML includes the ability to increase or decrease the volume on a leg or on the call and the capability to create sub-conferences. MSCML also addresses other feature requirements for large-scale conferencing applications, such as sizing and resizing of a conference.

SIP and MSCML are used to develop and deploy services within the IP applications and services architecture. This network topology consists of application servers and media servers which work together in a client-server relationship, with application servers (clients) providing the service logic for each specific application and the media server (server) acting as a shared media processing resource for the applications. The media server operates as an independent entity, managing and allocating its processing resources to match the requirements of each application. Its primary role is to handle requests from the application server for performing media processing on packetized media streams.
