= Multimodal browser =

A multimodal browser is one which allows multimodal interaction for input and/or output—for example, keyboard and voice interfaces. Examples include Opera and NetFront.
