= Plum Voice =

- Company type: Privately Held / Employee-Owned
- Industry: Telecom and Software
- Founded: 2000
- Founder: Matt Ervin
- Key people: CEO: Matt Ervin
- Website: www.plumvoice.com

The Plum Group, Inc. (DBA Plum Voice) is a company.

Plum is headquartered in New York City with offices in Boston and Denver.

== History ==
Plum Voice, founded in 2000 as The Plum Group, Inc., was incorporated to create technologies for personalized audio communication. By 2001, Plum had commercialized the open-standard Plum VoiceXML IVR platform which facilitated the creation of dynamic telecom applications.

- 2001 - Commercial launch of Plum VoiceXML IVR platform for customer-premises deployment
- 2002 - Launch of Plum Voice Hosting Centers for 24x7x365 managed IVR hosting
- 2004 - Plum Voice application suite receives a "Product of the Year" award from Customer Interactions magazine
- 2008 - Plum Survey builder launched, a do-it-yourself IVR survey tool.
- 2010 - Plum launched QuickFuse, a web-based rapid development platform used to create voice applications.
- 2013 - Plum launched VoiceTrends, an analytics and reporting toolkit designed specifically for voice applications. Plum achieves PCI-DSS Level 1.
- 2015 - Plum launched Plum Insight, a multi-channel (voice, web, mobile) survey platform. Plum achieves HIPAA compliance.
- 2016 - Plum launched a new version of QuickFuse called Fuse+.
- 2020 - Plum sunsets QuickFuse, rebrands Fuse+ as Plum Fuse.

== See also ==
- IVR
- PaaS
- SaaS
- Speech recognition
- Voice
- VoiceXML
