= Ink Serialized Format =

File format to store input from a stylus

Ink Serialized Format (ISF) is a Microsoft format to store written ink information. The format is mainly used for mobile devices like Personal digital assistants, tablet PCs and Ultra-Mobile PCs to store data entered with a stylus.

An ink object is simply a sequence of strokes, where each stroke is a sequence of points, and the points are X, and Y coordinates. Many of the new mobile devices can also provide information such as pressure, and angle. In addition, it can be used to store custom information along with the ink data.

== Availability ==
Its specification is freely available for download. Microsoft has added the ISF format to its technologies available under the Open Specification Promise making ISF related technology patent claims available for everybody to use or implement ISF.

This allows for ISF format to be used even together with open source software licensing like GPL2.

== See also ==
- InkML
