= Ship and Offshore Structural Mechanics Laboratory =

South Korean research laboratory

Ship and Offshore Structural Mechanics Laboratory Pusan National University
- Type: National Research Laboratory
- Established: 1989
- Location: Busan, South Korea
- Website: http://alps.ac

The Ship and Offshore Structural Mechanics Laboratory (SSML) is a laboratory in the Department of Naval Architecture and Ocean Engineering of Pusan National University. The SSML develops methods useful for strength analysis and structural design of marine structures. The methods developed should be helpful for achievement of high performance of the structural system. The Laboratory has the facilities for numerical and experimental studies. This includes mechanical testing equipment (static and dynamic loading machines) and high-speed computers with non-linear finite element programmes.

== Major research fields ==
- Buckling and Ultimate Strength / Limit States Design
- Impact Engineering (Collision and Grounding Mechanics)
- Risk Assessment / Structural Reliability Engineering
- Condition Assessment of Aged Structures
- Design of Weight-Critical Structures (Aluminum Alloy)
- Fire and Gas Explosion
- Impact Pressure Actions Arising from Sloshing, Slamming and Green Water

== Major research Topics ==
- Fracture of membrane type LNG carrier's insulation structures under dynamic impact loads due to sloshing

Sloshing loads can cause structural damage in the insulation structures of the LNG cargo tanks and also their internal structures such as stiffeners and equipment like LNG pump towers. Structural failure of insulation structures leads to a catastrophic situation of the vessel. LS-DYNA3D numerical simulations and fracture testing are being undertaken on the material and insulation box / panel structure models.

- Buckling collapse of steel and aluminum structures

Steel stiffened panels are important in a variety of marine and land-based applications including ships, offshore platforms and box girder bridges. Aluminum panels are used for building high speed ships. Numerical and experimental studies on buckling and ultimate strength of steel and aluminum stiffened panels are being undertaken.

- Collision and grounding of ships

Ship collisions and grounding continue to occur regardless of continuous efforts to prevent such accidents. With the increasing demand for safety at sea and for protection of the environment, it is of crucial importance to be able to reduce the probability of accidents, assess their consequences and ultimately minimize or prevent potential damages to the ships and the marine environment. Numerical and experimental studies on collision and grounding of ships are being undertaken.

- Condition assessment of aging ships

Failures in ship structures, including total losses, continue to occur worldwide, in spite of ongoing continuous efforts to prevent them. Such failures can have enormous costs associated with them, including lost lives in some cases. One of the possible causes of marine casualties is the inability of aging ships to withstand rough seas and weather, because the ship's structural safety becomes reduced during later life although it is quite adequate at the design stage and perhaps some 15 years beyond. Condition assessment scheme (CAS) is being developed.

- Dynamic Crushing of plated Structures due to Impact

The axial crushing of a square section steel tube was done by impact loading. The test was carried out using the drop hammer machine. Based on the test results, mean crushing strength and effective crashing distance of plated structures under impact have been evaluated. The results could be useful for structural design of vessels and automobiles against collision accidents. The detailed results were published in Journal of Ship Research, Vol.41, No.2, 1997.

- Collapse Tests of Mild Steel Corrugated Bulkhead Models

Collapse tests on nine mild steel corrugated bulkhead models having five bays of corrugations were carried out, varying the corrugation angle, the plate thickness and the type of loading (axial compression and / or lateral pressure). The detailed results were published in Journal of Ship Research, Vol.41, No.4, 1997.

- Experimental Investigation of Structural Crash worthiness in Ship Collision and Grounding using Double Skinned Structural Models

A total of six double skinned structural models, namely four mild steel models and two aluminum alloy models, have been tested in a quasi-static loading condition, varying the plate thickness and the initial colliding location. The mild steel models were designed to represent side or bottom structures typical in double hull tankers or LNG carriers. The aluminum alloy models were designed to examine the internal mechanics in collision and grounding of aluminum alloy hull vessels for future designs. A same type indentor with a conical shape regarded as a striking body was used for the tests of all models.
