= Speech Synthesis Markup Language =

XML-based markup language

Speech Synthesis Markup Language (SSML) is an XML-based markup language for speech synthesis applications. It is a recommendation of the W3C's Voice Browser Working Group. SSML is often embedded in VoiceXML scripts to drive interactive telephony systems. However, it also may be used alone, such as for creating audio books. For desktop applications, other markup languages are popular, including Apple's embedded speech commands, and Microsoft's SAPI Text to speech (TTS) markup, also an XML language. It is also used to produce sounds via Azure Cognitive Services' Text to Speech API or when writing third-party skills for Google Assistant or Amazon Alexa.

SSML is based on the Java Speech Markup Language (JSML) developed by Sun Microsystems, although the current recommendation was developed mostly by speech synthesis vendors. It covers virtually all aspects of synthesis, although some areas have been left unspecified, so each vendor accepts a different variant of the language. Also, in the absence of markup, the synthesizer is expected to do its own interpretation of the text.

== Example ==
Here is an example of an SSML document:

<?xml version="1.0"?>
<speak xmlns="http://www.w3.org/2001/10/synthesis"
       xmlns:dc="http://purl.org/dc/elements/1.1/"
       version="1.0">
  <metadata>
    <dc:title xml:lang="en">Telephone Menu: Level 1</dc:title>
  </metadata>

  <p>
    <s xml:lang="en-US">
      <voice name="David" gender="male" age="25">
        For English, press <emphasis>one</emphasis>.
      </voice>
    </s>
    <s xml:lang="es-MX">
      <voice name="Miguel" gender="male" age="25">
        Para español, oprima el <emphasis>dos</emphasis>.
      </voice>
    </s>
  </p>

</speak>

== Features ==
SSML specifies a fair amount of markup for prosody, which is not included in the above example. This includes markup for

- pitch
- contour
- pitch range
- rate
- duration
- volume

== See also ==
- Pronunciation Lexicon Specification (PLS)
- Speech Recognition Grammar Specification (SRGS)
- Semantic Interpretation for Speech Recognition (SISR)
- SABLE speech synthesis markup language, intended to combine SSML, STML, and JSML
