= Speech Recognition Grammar Specification =

World Wide Web Consortium standard

Speech Recognition Grammar Specification (SRGS) is a W3C standard for how speech recognition grammars are specified. A speech recognition grammar is a set of word patterns, and tells a speech recognition system what to expect a human to say. For instance, if you call an auto-attendant application, it will prompt you for the name of a person (with the expectation that your call will be transferred to that person's phone). It will then start up a speech recognizer, giving it a speech recognition grammar. This grammar contains the names of the people in the auto attendant's directory and a collection of sentence patterns that are the typical responses from callers to the prompt.

SRGS specifies two alternate but equivalent syntaxes, one based on XML, and one using augmented BNF format. In practice, the XML syntax is used more frequently.

Both the ABNF and XML form have the expressive power of a context-free grammar. A grammar processor that does not support recursive grammars has the expressive power of a finite-state machine or regular expression language.

If the speech recognizer returned just a string containing the actual words spoken by the user, the voice application would have to do the tedious job of extracting the semantic meaning from those words. For this reason, SRGS grammars can be decorated with tag elements, which when executed, build up the semantic result. SRGS does not specify the contents of the tag elements: this is done in a companion W3C standard, Semantic Interpretation for Speech Recognition (SISR). SISR is based on ECMAScript, and ECMAScript statements inside the SRGS tags build up an ECMAScript semantic result object that is easy for the voice application to process.

Both SRGS and SISR are W3C Recommendations, the final stage of the W3C standards track. The W3C VoiceXML standard, which defines how voice dialogs are specified, depends heavily on SRGS and SISR.

== Examples ==
Here is an example of the augmented BNF of SRGS, as it could be used in an auto attendant application:

 #ABNF 1.0 ISO-8859-1;
 
 // Default grammar language is US English
 language en-US;
 
 // Single language attachment to tokens
 // Note that "fr-CA" (Canadian French) is applied to only
 //  the word "oui" because of precedence rules
 $yes = yes | oui!fr-CA;
 
 // Single language attachment to an expansion
 $people1 = (Michel Tremblay | André Roy)!fr-CA;
 
 // Handling language-specific pronunciations of the same word
 // A capable speech recognizer will listen for Mexican Spanish and
 //   US English pronunciations.
 $people2 = Jose!en-US | Jose!es-MX;
 
 /**
  * Multi-lingual input possible
  * @example may I speak to André Roy
  * @example may I speak to Jose
  */
 public $request = may I speak to ($people1 | $people2);

Here is the same SRGS example, using the XML form:

<?xml version="1.0" encoding="ISO-8859-1"?>
<!DOCTYPE grammar PUBLIC "-//W3C//DTD GRAMMAR 1.0//EN"
                  "http://www.w3.org/TR/speech-grammar/grammar.dtd">
  
<!-- the default grammar language is US English -->
<grammar xmlns="http://www.w3.org/2001/06/grammar"
         xmlns:xsi="http://www.w3.org/2001/XMLSchema-instance" 
         xsi:schemaLocation="http://www.w3.org/2001/06/grammar 
                             http://www.w3.org/TR/speech-grammar/grammar.xsd"
         xml:lang="en-US" version="1.0">
  
  <!--
     single language attachment to tokens
     "yes" inherits US English language
     "oui" is Canadian French language
  -->
  <rule id="yes">
    <one-of>
      <item>yes</item>
      <item xml:lang="fr-CA">oui</item>
    </one-of>
  </rule> 
  
  <!-- Single language attachment to an expansion -->
  <rule id="people1">
    <one-of xml:lang="fr-CA">
      <item>Michel Tremblay</item>
      <item>André Roy</item>
    </one-of>
  </rule>
  
  <!--
     Handling language-specific pronunciations of the same word
     A capable speech recognizer will listen for Mexican Spanish 
     and US English pronunciations.
  -->
  <rule id="people2">
    <one-of>
      <item xml:lang="en-US">Jose</item>
      <item xml:lang="es-MX">Jose</item>
    </one-of>
  </rule>
  
  <!-- Multi-lingual input is possible -->
  <rule id="request" scope="public">
    <example> may I speak to André Roy </example>
    <example> may I speak to Jose </example>
  
    may I speak to
    <one-of>
      <item> <ruleref uri="#people1"/> </item>
      <item> <ruleref uri="#people2"/> </item>
    </one-of>
  </rule>
</grammar>

== See also ==
- SISR
- VoiceXML
- Pronunciation Lexicon Specification (PLS)
- Natural Language Semantics Markup Language
- JSGF
