= Semantic Interpretation for Speech Recognition =

World Wide Web Consortium recommendation

Semantic Interpretation for Speech Recognition (SISR) defines the syntax and semantics of annotations to grammar rules in the Speech Recognition Grammar Specification (SRGS). Since 5 April 2007, it is a World Wide Web Consortium recommendation.

By building upon SRGS grammars, it allows voice browsers via ECMAScript to semantically interpret complex grammars and provide the information back to the application. For example, it allows utterances like "I would like a Coca-cola and three large pizzas with pepperoni and mushrooms." to be interpreted into an object that can be understood by an application. For example, the utterance could produce the following object named order:

 {
   drink: {
     liquid:"coke",
     drinksize:"medium"
   },
   pizza: {
     number: "3",
     pizzasize: "large",
     topping: [ "pepperoni", "mushrooms" ]
   }
 }

If used against this grammar that includes SISR markup in addition to the standard SRGS grammar in XML format:

<?xml version="1.0" encoding="UTF-8"?> 
<!DOCTYPE grammar PUBLIC "-//W3C//DTD GRAMMAR 1.0//EN"
                  "http://www.w3.org/TR/speech-grammar/grammar.dtd">
<grammar xmlns="http://www.w3.org/2001/06/grammar" xml:lang="en"
         xmlns:xsi="http://www.w3.org/2001/XMLSchema-instance"
         xsi:schemaLocation="http://www.w3.org/2001/06/grammar
                             http://www.w3.org/TR/speech-grammar/grammar.xsd"
         version="1.0" mode="voice" tag-format="semantics/1.0" root="order">
   <rule id="order">
      I would like a
      <ruleref uri="#drink"/>
      <tag>out.drink = new Object(); out.drink.liquid=rules.drink.type;
           out.drink.drinksize=rules.drink.drinksize;</tag>
      and
      <ruleref uri="#pizza"/>
      <tag>out.pizza=rules.pizza;</tag>
   </rule>
   <rule id="kindofdrink">
      <one-of>
         <item>coke</item>
         <item>pepsi</item>
         <item>coca cola<tag>out="coke";</tag></item>
      </one-of>
   </rule>
   <rule id="foodsize">
      <tag>out="medium";</tag> <!-- "medium" is default if nothing said -->
      <item repeat="0-1">
         <one-of>
            <item>small<tag>out="small";</tag></item>
            <item>medium</item>
            <item>large<tag>out="large";</tag></item>
            <item>regular<tag>out="medium";</tag></item>
         </one-of>
      </item>
   </rule>
   <!-- Construct Array of toppings, return Array -->
   <rule id="tops">
      <tag>out=new Array;</tag>
      <ruleref uri="#top"/>
      <tag>out.push(rules.top);</tag>
      <item repeat="1-">
         and
         <ruleref uri="#top"/>
         <tag>out.push(rules.top);</tag>
      </item>
   </rule>
   <rule id="top">
      <one-of>
         <item>anchovies</item>
         <item>pepperoni</item>
         <item>mushroom<tag>out="mushrooms";</tag></item>
         <item>mushrooms</item>
      </one-of>
   </rule>
   <!-- Two properties (drinksize, type) on left hand side Rule Variable -->
   <rule id="drink">
      <ruleref uri="#foodsize"/>
      <ruleref uri="#kindofdrink"/>
      <tag>out.drinksize=rules.foodsize; out.type=rules.kindofdrink;</tag>
   </rule>
   <!-- Three properties on rules.pizza -->
   <rule id="pizza">
      <ruleref uri="#number"/>
      <ruleref uri="#foodsize"/>
      <tag>out.pizzasize=rules.foodsize; out.number=rules.number;</tag>
      pizzas with
      <ruleref uri="#tops"/>
      <tag>out.topping=rules.tops;</tag>
   </rule>
   <rule id="number">
      <one-of>
         <item>
            <tag>out=1;</tag>
            <one-of>
               <item>a</item>
               <item>one</item>
            </one-of>
         </item>
         <item>two<tag>out=2;</tag></item>
         <item>three<tag>out=3;</tag></item>
      </one-of>
   </rule>
</grammar>

== See also ==
- VoiceXML
- SRGS
