= World Wide Web Consortium =

International standards organization

- Logo since 2025
- Abbreviation: W3C
- Formation: 1 October 1994; 32 years ago
- Founder: Tim Berners-Lee
- Type: Standards organization
- Headquarters: Cambridge, Massachusetts, United States
- Locations: 4 offices: Main Office: MIT/CSAIL, US; ERCIM, France; Keio University/SFC, Japan; Beihang University, China
- Coordinates: 42°21′43″N 71°05′26″W
- Region served: Worldwide
- Members: 331 member organizations (2026)
- CEO: Seth Dobbs
- Staff: 53 (2025)
- Website: www.w3.org

The World Wide Web Consortium (W3C) is the main international standards organization for the World Wide Web. Founded in 1994 by Tim Berners-Lee, the consortium is made up of member organizations that maintain full-time staff working together in the development of technical standards for the World Wide Web. As of March 2026, W3C has 331 members. The organization has been led by CEO Seth Dobbs since October 2023. W3C also engages in education and outreach, develops software and serves as an open forum for discussion about the Web.

== History ==
The World Wide Web Consortium (W3C) was founded in 1994 by Tim Berners-Lee after he left the European Organization for Nuclear Research (CERN) in October 1994. It was founded at the Massachusetts Institute of Technology (MIT) Laboratory for Computer Science with support from the European Commission, and the Defense Advanced Research Projects Agency, which had pioneered the ARPANET, the most direct predecessor to the modern Internet. It was located in Technology Square until 2004, when it moved, with the MIT Computer Science and Artificial Intelligence Laboratory, to the Stata Center.

The organization tries to foster compatibility and agreement among industry members in the adoption of new standards defined by the W3C. Incompatible versions of HTML are offered by different vendors, causing inconsistency in how web pages are displayed. The consortium tries to get all those vendors to implement a set of core principles and components that are chosen by the consortium.

It was originally intended that CERN host the European branch of W3C; however, CERN wished to focus on particle physics, not information technology. In April 1995, the French Institute for Research in Computer Science and Automation became the European host of W3C, with Keio University Research Institute at SFC becoming the Asian host in September 1996. Starting in 1997, W3C created regional offices around the world. As of September 2009, it had eighteen World Offices covering Australia, the Benelux countries (Belgium, Netherlands and Luxembourg), Brazil, China, Finland, Germany, Austria, Greece, Hong Kong, Hungary, India, Israel, Italy, South Korea, Morocco, South Africa, Spain, Sweden, and, as of 2016, the United Kingdom and Ireland.

In 2010, Jeffrey M. Jaffe was named CEO of W3C. He continued in that position until 2022.

In October 2012, W3C convened a community of major web players and publishers to establish a MediaWiki wiki that seeks to document open web standards called the WebPlatform and WebPlatform Docs.

In January 2013, Beihang University became the Chinese host.

In 2022 the W3C WebFonts Working Group won an Emmy Award from the National Academy of Television Arts and Sciences for standardizing font technology for custom downloadable fonts and typography for web and TV devices.

On 1 January 2023, it reformed as a public-interest 501(c)(3) non-profit organization. In October 2023, Seth Dobbs was named as the organization's chief executive officer.

W3C logo prior to October 2025

In October 2025, the W3C unveiled a new logo, signaling positive changes and updated its tagline to "making the web work — for everyone". This reflects its evolution into a nonprofit organization and continued focus on global accessibility, collaboration, innovation, privacy, security and the future of web standards.

== Standardization process ==
W3C develops technical specifications for HTML5, CSS, SVG, WOFF, the Semantic Web Stack, XML, and other technologies. Sometimes, when a specification becomes too large, it is split into independent modules that can progress through development stages at their own pace. Subsequent editions of a module or specification are known as levels and are denoted by the first integer in the title (e.g. CSS3 is Level 3). Subsequent revisions on each level are denoted by an integer following a decimal point (for example, CSS2.1 is Revision 1).

The W3C standard formation process is defined within the W3C process document, outlining four development stages through which each new standard or recommendation must progress.

=== Working draft (WD) ===
After enough content has been gathered from 'editor drafts' and discussion, it may be published as a working draft (WD) for review by the community. A WD document is the first form of a standard that is publicly available. Commentary by virtually anyone is accepted, though no promises are made with regard to action on any particular element commented upon.

At this stage, the standard document may have significant differences from its final form. As such, anyone who implements WD standards should be ready to significantly modify their implementations once the standard is finalized.

=== Candidate recommendation (CR) ===
A candidate recommendation is a version of a more advanced standard than the WD. At this point, the group responsible for the standard is satisfied that the standard meets its goal. The purpose of the CR is to elicit aid from the development community on how implementable the standard is.

The standard document may change further, but significant features are mostly decided at this point. The design of those features can still change due to feedback from implementers.

=== Proposed recommendation (PR) ===
A proposed recommendation is the version of a standard that has passed the prior two levels. The users of the standard provide input. At this stage, the document is submitted to the W3C Advisory Council for final approval.

While this step is important, it rarely causes any significant changes to a standard as it passes to the next phase.

=== W3C recommendation (REC) ===
The standard has been finalized and is now official. At this point, the standard has undergone extensive review and testing, under both theoretical and practical conditions. The standard is now endorsed by the W3C, indicating its readiness for deployment to the public, and encouraging more widespread support among implementers and authors.

=== Later revisions ===
A recommendation may be updated or extended by separately-published, non-technical errata or editor drafts until sufficient substantial edits accumulate for producing a new edition or level of the recommendation. Additionally, the W3C publishes various kinds of informative notes which are to be used as references.

== Administration ==
In January 2023, after 28 years of being jointly administered by the MIT Computer Science and Artificial Intelligence Laboratory (located in Stata Center) in the United States, the European Research Consortium for Informatics and Mathematics (ERCIM; in Sophia Antipolis, France), Keio University (in Japan) and Beihang University (in China), the W3C incorporated as a legal entity, becoming a public-interest not-for-profit organization.

The W3C has a staff team of 70–80 worldwide as of 2015. W3C is run by a management team which allocates resources and designs strategy. It also includes an advisory board that supports strategy and legal matters and helps resolve conflicts. The majority of standardization work is done by external experts in the W3C's various working groups.

== Membership ==
The Consortium is governed by its membership. The list of members is available to the public. Members include businesses, nonprofit organizations, universities, governmental entities, and individuals.

Membership requirements are transparent except for one requirement: An application for membership must be reviewed and approved by the W3C. Many guidelines and requirements are stated in detail, but there is no final guideline about the process or standards by which membership might be finally approved or denied.

The cost of membership is given on a sliding scale, depending on the character of the organization applying and the country in which it is located. Countries are categorized by the World Bank's most recent grouping by gross national income per capita.

== Criticism ==
In a 2007 issue of the German C't computer magazine in an interview with Herbert Braun Opera CTO Håkon Wium Lie, who introduced the concept of style sheets to the W3C in 1994 and worked on the CSS specification, criticized the course of the W3C, its recommendation of XHTML, and the general standardization process in the W3C:

Second, W3C has also evolved. In the early days, turning a Working Draft into a Recommendation was a simple month-long stint as Proposed Recommendation. These days, you have to issue call for comments, answer all the comments, make sure there are two implementations, and so forth. The formal process has become much longer and only specifications that have serious backers end up as Recommendations.

— Håkon Wium Lie

In 2012 and 2013, the W3C started considering adding DRM-specific Encrypted Media Extensions (EME) to HTML5, which was criticised as being against the openness, interoperability, and vendor neutrality that distinguished websites built using only W3C standards from those requiring proprietary plug-ins like Flash. On 18 September 2017, the W3C published the EME specification as a recommendation, leading to the Electronic Frontier Foundation's resignation from W3C. As feared by the opponents of EME, as of 2020, none of the widely used Content Decryption Modules used with EME are available for licensing without a per-browser licensing fee.

In October 2017, the W3C received the Austrian "Big Brother Award", a negative award, in the "Government and Administration" category for introducing EME as a web standard.

== Recommendations ==
W3C Recommendations:

- ActivityPub, decentralized social networking protocol
- CSS
  - CSS animations
  - CSS box model
  - CSS Flexible Box Layout
  - CSS grid layout
- Data Catalog Vocabulary
- Document Object Model
- Efficient XML Interchange
- Emotion Markup Language
- Encrypted Media Extensions, DRM modules integration standard
- EPUB, an ebook file format
- GRDDL
- HTML, standard web markup language
- JSON-LD, linked data JSON extension
- MathML, mathematical notation markup language
- Micropub, client-server protocol to post & edit content on websites
- Message Transmission Optimization Mechanism (MTOM)
- Web Ontology Language
- PROV
- Resource Description Framework (RDF), family of metadata standards and associated serialization formats
  - N-Triples and N-Quads
  - RDF Schema
  - RDF/XML
  - TriG
  - Turtle
- SAWSDL
- Semantic Interpretation for Speech Recognition
- Simple Knowledge Organization System
- Synchronized Multimedia Integration Language
- SOAP
- SPARQL
- Speech Recognition Grammar Specification
- Speech Synthesis Markup Language
- State Chart XML
- Scalable Vector Graphics, vector image format
- Timed Text Markup Language
- VoiceXML
- WAI-ARIA
- Web Content Accessibility Guidelines
- WebAssembly, portable binary format and assembly language
- Web Authentication
- WebDriver, a platform based on language-neutral wire protocol to remotely instruct the behavior of web browsers
- Webmention, protocol for websites to notify other websites
- Web of Things
- Web Open Font Format
- WebRTC, real-time communication standard
- Web Services Description Language
- Web Share API
- WebSub
- WebVTT
- WebXR Device API
- WS-Addressing
- XHTML
  - XHTML+RDFa
  - XHTML+Voice
- XML and related specifications
  - XForms
  - XML Encryption
  - XML Events
  - XML Information Set
  - XML Namespaces
  - XML Schema
  - XPath
  - XML Signature
  - XQuery
- XSL Formatting Objects
- XSLT
- XTiger

Obsoleted:

- P3P

=== Java packages ===
The org.w3c.dom standard library packages in the Java programming language provide interfaces for the Document Object Model (DOM).

The org.xml.sax standard library packages provide interfaces for the Simple API for XML (SAX).

== See also ==
- Browser wars – Competition between web browsing applications for share of worldwide usage
- History of the Internet
- History of the World Wide Web
- History of web browsers
- LAMP (software bundle)
- List of web browsers
- Server (computing)
- Application server
- Comparison of web server software
- HTTP server (core part of a web server program that serves HTTP requests)
- HTTP compression
- Web application
- Open source web application
- Protocol Wars
- Variant object
- Virtual hosting
- Web server
- Web standards
- Web Standards Project
- Web hosting service
- Web container
- Web proxy
- Web service
