= Comparison of speech synthesizers =

Here is a non-exhaustive comparison of speech synthesis programs:

== General ==
| Name | Creator(s) | First public release date | Latest stable version | Software license |
|---|---|---|---|---|
| 15.ai | 15 | 2020 | 2025 | |
| Apple PlainTalk | Apple Inc. | 1984 | 2018 | Bundled with Mac OS X |
| AT&T Natural Voices | AT&T Natural Voices | ? | 2008 | Proprietary |
| Polly | Amazon AWS | 2016 | 2019 | Proprietary |
| Cepstral | Cepstral | 2000 | 2013 | Proprietary |
| CereProc | CereProc | 2006 | 2017, February | Proprietary |
| eSpeak | Jonathan Duddington | 2006, February 10 | 2022, April 3 | GPLv3+ |
| Festival Speech Synthesis System | CSTR | ? | 2014, December | MIT-like license |
| FreeTTS | Paul Lamere; Philip Kwok; Dirk Schnelle-Walka; Willie Walker... | 2001, December 14 | 2009, March 9 | BSD |
| LumenVox | LumenVox | 2011 | 2019 | Proprietary |
| Microsoft Speech API | Microsoft | 1995 | 2012 | Bundled with Windows |
| VoiceText | ReadSpeaker (Formerly Neospeech) | 2002 | 2017 | Proprietary |
| Nuance Vocalizer | Nuance Communications, Inc. | ? | 2018 | Proprietary |
| Typecast (AI voice generator) | Neosapience | 2019 | 2025, September | Proprietary |

== Technical voice details ==
| Platform | SSML | SAPI version | WS | PLS | CLI |
|---|---|---|---|---|---|
| 15.ai | ? | ? | ? | ? | ? |
| Apple PlainTalk | ? | ? | ? | ? | ? |
| AT&T Natural Voices | Yes | 5.1 | ? | ? | ? |
| Cepstral (company) | Yes | 5.x | Yes | Yes | Yes |
| CereProc | Yes | 5.x | Yes | Yes | Yes |
| eSpeak | Yes | 5.x | ? | ? | Yes |
| Festival Speech Synthesis System | ? | ? | ? | ? | Yes |
| FreeTTS | ? | ? | ? | ? | ? |
| LumenVox | Yes | 5.x | Yes | Yes | Yes |
| Microsoft Speech API | 5.x only | 4.x/5.x | ? | ? | ? |
| Nuance Vocalizer | ? | ? | ? | ? | ? |
| VoiceText | Yes | 5.x | ? | ? | ? |

== Technical details ==
| Name | Online demo | Available language(s) | Available voices | Programming language | Operating system(s) |
|---|---|---|---|---|---|
| 15.ai | Yes | English (United States) | 50+ | Python | Any |
| Apple PlainTalk | ? | English (United States), ... | 15+ | ? | Macintosh |
| AT&T Natural Voices | Yes | English (British), English (Indian), English (US), French, French (Canadian), German, Italian, Spanish (Latin American) | 20 | C++ | Linux; Windows |
| Cepstral | Yes | English (British), English (US), Italian, French (Canadian), German, Spanish (American), ... | 25+ | C/C++ | Mac OS X Windows i386-Linux x86-64-Linux; Sparc-Solaris i386-Solaris |
| CereProc | Yes | English (British), English (US), English (Scottish), English (Irish), French, French (Canadian), German, Austrian German, Italian, Irish, Spanish (Castilian), Spanish (Latin American), Dutch, Polish, Portuguese, Portuguese (Brazilian), Japanese, Catalan, Scottish Gaelic, Swedish, Russian, Mandarin | 46 | Java / C C++ / Objective C / Python / C# & .Net through SAPI | Linux; Windows; Mac OS X Embedded Linux; Android iOS; Cloud service |
| eSpeak | Samples | Afrikaans, Albanian, Armenian, Cantonese, Catalan, Croatian, Czech, Danish, Dutch, English (British, US, Scottish, Westindies...), Esperanto, Estonian, Finnish, French (France, Belgium), Georgian, German, Greek, Hindi, Hungarian, Icelandic, Indonesian, Italian, Kannada, Kurdish, Latvian, Lojban, Macedonian, Malayalam, Mandarin, Norwegian, Persian, Polish, Portuguese, Romanian, Russian, Serbian, Slovak, Spanish, Swahili, Swedish, Tamil, Turkish, Vietnamese, Welsh. | several | C++ | Linux; Windows; Mac OS X RISC OS |
| Festival Speech Synthesis System | Yes | English (UK), English (US), Spanish, Hindi, Croatian, Finnish, Polish, Welsh. | Several | C++ | Linux; Windows |
| FreeTTS | ? | English... | Several | Java | Cross-platform |
| LumenVox | Yes | Danish, Dutch, English (Australian), English (US), English (UK), English (Welsh), English (Indian), French, French (Canadian), German, Icelandic, Italian, Polish, Portuguese, Portuguese (Brazilian), Romanian, Russian, Spanish (North American), Spanish (Latin American), Spanish (Castilian), Swedish, Turkish, Welsh, Welsh English | 57 | C/C++ | Windows; Linux |
| Nuance Vocalizer | Yes | US English, Australian English, Indian English, Irish English, South African English, UK English, Argentinian Spanish, Castilian Spanish, Colombian Spanish, Mexican Spanish, Arabic, Catalan, Basque, Galician, Dutch, Belgian Dutch, Portuguese, Brazilian Portuguese, Bulgarian, French, Canadian French, Cantonese (Hong Kong), Mandarin, Mandarin Taiwanese, Czech, Danish, Finnish, German, Greek, Hebrew, Hindi, Hungarian, Indonesian, Italian, Japanese, Korean, Norwegian, Polish, Romanian, Russian, Slovak, Swedish, Thai, Turkish | 70+ | C/C++ | Windows; Linux; Android |
| VoiceText | Yes | English (US), English (British), American Spanish, Canadian French, Chinese Mandarin, Japanese, Korean | 13 | C/C++/Java | Windows; Linux |
