= VSI =

VSI may stand for:

- Vertical shaft impactor, a type of impact crusher
- Vertical speed indicator, an instrument in an aircraft monitoring rate of descent or climb
- Very Short Introductions, a series of books published by Oxford University Press
- Virtual Switching Instance, in VPLS
- Voluntary Service International, the Irish branch of Service Civil International
- VMS Software Inc. A vendor/supporter of OpenVMS related software.
- VSI Group, British dubbing and translation company
  - VSI Berlin GmbH, German subsidiary
  - VSI Translation & Subtitling BV, Dutch subsidiary
- Vendor's Single Interest insurance, a type of insurance that only protects the lien holder, as opposed to dual coverage insurance
- Voltage Source Inverter, DC to AC converter
