= Call-recording services =

Commercial enterprise that records telephone calls for a fee

A call recording service is a commercial enterprise that can record telephone calls for a fee.

For example, a lawyer needing to record conversations with clients, for example, must be able to capture calls from an office telephone system, from a mobile phone, and a home line. Traditionally, this required three recording systems, one PBX-based, one smartphone-based, and one PC-based. These recordings, of course, end up in three different places. Managing this complexity is difficult, expensive, and inefficient. A service approach instead records calls over all three devices and provide convenient access to all recordings.

== History ==
Until recently, recording a telephone call required special hardware or software. The introduction of Alphabet Google's Android 9 Pie made call recording prohibitively difficult without rooting the phone.

=== Hardware ===
Hardware recording devices are cumbersome and expensive, limiting their use to law enforcement agencies. For this reason, hardware-based is frequently conflated with telephone tapping. In the era of mobile telephony, services that require a device to be in a specific location have little use.

=== Software ===
Software-based recording solutions emerged shortly after soundboards were introduced for the personal computer in the late 1980s and on mobile telephones after the release of the first smartphones.

=== VoIP ===
Voice over IP (VoIP) telephony began emerging in the 1990s. In commercial environments VoIP was first used behind corporate PBXes in order to deploy telephones capable of delivering additional computing services. In the consumer environment, VoIP was introduced to allow people to bypass long-distance charges, either allowing callers to communicate directly, or allowing them to connect to local bridges. Telcos deployed IP-based backbones later in order to more efficiently carry long-distance traffic.

The rapid growth of VoIP-based telephony led to the introduction of a plethora of VoIP recording solutions.

== Service approaches ==
Call recording services follow one of three models: calling card, device-based redirect or cloud bridge.

Vendors are quickly moving towards hybrid approaches designed to meet the needs of various communities.

=== Calling card ===
The earliest services used the calling card model, making use of telephony service wholesalers. The caller dials a central number, enters a code or key, and then dial the desired number. The service connects the call and records the interaction. RecordAll is an example of a service built using this model.

=== Device redirect ===
The device redirect approach automatically conferences in the recording service into every call.

In 2008 the Financial Services Authority (FSA) in the United Kingdom required regulated financial services firms to record their employees' mobile calls. Due to industry push-back and implementation difficulties, the requirement was delayed until November 2011.

=== Cloud bridge model ===
The first cloud-bridge service was introduced in the US in early 2011.

Such services place almost all of the functionality in the cloud, a remote service that stores recordings outside customer premises and makes recordings available over the internet. Calls come from VoIP clients, smartphones, web browsers and applications.

Some services, in particular those supporting VoIP clients, appear to make a direct connection to the destination telephone. Signaling the service to record the call takes place transparently.

Others approaches signal the service to place a call, but do not call into it. Instead, the service calls both the source and destination numbers, bridges them and records the conversation.

Google Voice and Calltrunk are examples. Google Voice requires that subscriber phones be registered with the service, whereas Calltrunk allows any phone to be used at any time. Google Voice allows inbound call recording only; Calltrunk only allows outbound call recording.

=== Service list ===
Service	Vendor	Model	Supported source handsets	Call/Recording trigger
Calltrunk	Call Trunk Holdings Ltd.	Cloud Bridge	All	iOS, Android, BlackBerry, Web applications
Google Voice	Google Inc.	Cloud Bridge	All Google Voice enabled	iOS, Android, BlackBerry, Web applications
Primal CRS	Primal Technologies Inc.	NFV AWS, VMWare, Openstack, Scale Computing	All - iOS, Android, Legacy phones	SIP Call events
Viirtue VoIP	Viirtue, LLC	Viirtue VoIP Platform	All	iOS, Android, Web Applications, SIP Phones, SIP Call Events
Dubber	Dubber	Cloud Bridge	All	All - includes iOS, Android, SIP Call events, SIPREC, VoIP, PSTN, PBX
