= CallApp =

Mobile app

- Developer: CallApp Software Ltd.
- Release: 21 May 2012; 14 years ago
- Operating system: Android iOS
- Type: caller ID, spam blocker, Telephone directory
- License: Proprietary
- Website: callapp.com

CallApp is a mobile app offering caller ID, call blocking and call recording. It gives background information about the entities behind incoming or outgoing calls by utilizing the user's community-generated content and social networking services.

== History ==
CallApp was invented and founded in 2011, in Tel Aviv, Israel by its former CEO, Oded Volovitz and current CEO, Amit On. raising $1 million in seed investment. It was initially introduced publicly at the TechCrunch Disrupt New York 2012, where it launched its application for Android, at the DEMO conference, and at the Mobile World Congress, Barcelona. It won the Geek Award for the fledgling start-up of the year 2012. In 2014, the company raised $4 million from the angel investors Saar Wilf and Moshe Lichtman and from Giza and Susquehanna venture capital funds. Amit On was named the company's CEO in 2014, CallApp had five million users along with 50,000 daily downloads, making it one of the 100 leading apps on Google Play. As of February 2021, it has over 100 million users.

== Features ==
CallApp provides caller ID, which gives the users the means to identify telemarketing, spammers and robocall numbers, and enables call blocking and blacklisting unsolicited callers. The app provides the user with real-time information about the entities behind incoming or outgoing calls by utilizing info that people and businesses share about themselves all over the web along with communications that CallApp community decides to share. The app synchronizes the user email and calendar, shows mutual contacts, and includes business information. It also offers call recording, telephone directory, reverse telephone directory, private browsing, call reminder and car mode, as well as paid upgrade options.

== See also ==
- RealCall
- Truecaller
