= Truecaller =

Swedish Mobile phone application

- Developer: True Software Scandinavia
- Release: July 1, 2009; 17 years ago
- Operating system: Android iOS; Wear OS
- Available in: Multilingual
- Type: Telephone directory, Caller ID, Spam blocker
- License: Freeware
- Website: www.truecaller.com

Truecaller is a smartphone application that has features of caller ID, call-blocking, flash-messaging, call-recording (on Android up to version 8), chat and voice by using the Internet. It requires users to provide a standard cellular mobile number for registering.

== History ==
Truecaller is developed by True Software Scandinavia AB, a public company listed in Sweden with a head office in Stockholm, Sweden, founded by Alan Mamedi and Nami Zarringhalam of Iranian origin in 2009, but most of its employees are in India.

It was initially launched on Symbian and Windows Mobile on 1 July 2009. It was released for Android and Apple iPhone on 23 September 2009, for BlackBerry on 27 February 2012, for Windows Phone on 1 March 2012, and for Nokia Series 40 on 3 September 2012.

As of September 2012, Truecaller had five million users performing 120 million searches of the telephone number database every month. As of 22 January 2013, Truecaller reached 10 million users. As of January 2017, Truecaller had reached 250 million users worldwide. As of 4 February 2020, it crossed 200 million monthly user-base globally, of which 150 million were from India.

On 18 September 2012, OpenOcean, a venture capital fund led by former MySQL and Nokia executives, invested US$1.3 million in Truecaller to push the company's global reach. Truecaller said that it intended to use the new funding to expand its footprint in "key markets"—specifically North America, Asia and the Middle East.

In February 2014, Truecaller received US$18.8 million in funding from Sequoia Capital, alongside existing investor OpenOcean, Truecaller chairman Stefan Lennhammer, and an unnamed private investor. It also announced a partnership with Yelp to use Yelp's API data to help identify business numbers when they call a smartphone. In October of the same year, they received US$60 million from Niklas Zennström's Atomico investment firm and from Kleiner Perkins Caufield & Byers.

On 7 July 2015, Truecaller launched its SMS app called TrueMessenger exclusively in India. TrueMessenger enables users to identify the sender of SMS messages. This launch was aimed at increasing the company's user base in India which are the bulk of its active users. TrueMessenger was integrated into the Truecaller app in April 2017.

In December 2019, Truecaller announced it plans to go public in an IPO in 2022. Truecaller has launched the Covid Hospital Directory keeping in mind the increasing cases of corona infection in India. Through this directory, Indian users will get information about the telephone number and address of Covid Hospitals.

In January 2025, Truecaller added real-time Caller ID and spam-blocking for iOS 18.2 users, functionality previously available to Android phone users.

The company continues to add features such as AI-based tools, subscriptions, and enterprise services, and in 2025 had a revenue rise of 39% in constant currency. As of 2026 Trucaller had more than 500 million users, of which 350 million are from India.

== Competitive and regulatory landscape ==
Truecaller gets about 75% of its revenue from India. The Indian regulatory body TRAI has a competing service for Caller ID based on CNAP (Caller Name Presentation). This would enable caller ID without the use of any apps. There were small tests done in June/July 2024. If this is rolled out pan India, analysts expect this to substantially impact the usage of Truecaller in India.

In a lawsuit in Nigeria, Truecaller defended their security and privacy policy stating that the users whose phone books were uploaded by Truecaller are the data controllers and that Truecaller is merely a data processor. This is different from Europe where they do not seem to upload users' phone books as it may run afoul of GDPR. There are now 2 more lawsuits against Truecaller in Nigeria seeking to end Truecaller's unconsented data practices (ONWUBUARIRI vs TRUECALLER INTERNATIONAL LLP and OKAFOR vs TRUECALLER INTERNATIONAL LLP).

In Aug/Sep 2024, the Indian regulatory body TRAI started cracking down on tele spammers. They instructed telecom providers to terminate all telecom resources of unregistered tele marketers (UTMs). This enforcement started in late August and is leading to a massive termination of spamming numbers and blacklisting their companies so that they cannot get any phone numbers from any other providers for 2 years. If this is (even partially) successful in disconnecting the top spamming companies, it may lead to a massive reduction in spam calls and thus reducing the number of ads shown by Truecaller.

In Feb 2025, IMY (Integritetsskyddsmyndigheten) which is Sweden's GDPR regulator started an investigation/supervision into the data practices of Truecaller. The decision is awaited.

== Security and privacy issues ==
On 17 July 2013, Truecaller servers were allegedly hacked into by the Syrian Electronic Army. E Hacking News reported the group identified 7 sensitive databases it claimed to have exfiltrated, primarily due to an unmaintained WordPress installation on the servers. Claims made regarding the size of the databases were inconsistent. On 18 July 2013, Truecaller issued a statement on its blog stating that their website was indeed hacked, but claiming that the attack did not disclose any passwords or credit card information.

Truecaller uploads users' stored contacts to their servers to form a database of phone numbers. This may violate GDPR and similar regulations in multiple countries.

Truecaller also tracks phone calls made by non-users to users (and vice versa) and hence collects information about those non users in detail. These non-users don't have a way to stop this data collection.

In November 2019, India-based security researcher Ehraz Ahmed discovered a security flaw that exposed user data as well as system and location information. Truecaller confirmed this information and the bug was immediately fixed.

Multiple times in 2020 and 2021, there were reports about a massive Truecaller database leak on the internet. The reports surfaced again in 2024. The leaked database has information regarding users' (and non-users') phone numbers, names, phone carrier, tags, email addresses, etc.

== See also ==
- CallApp
- RealCall
