= Call-recording hardware =

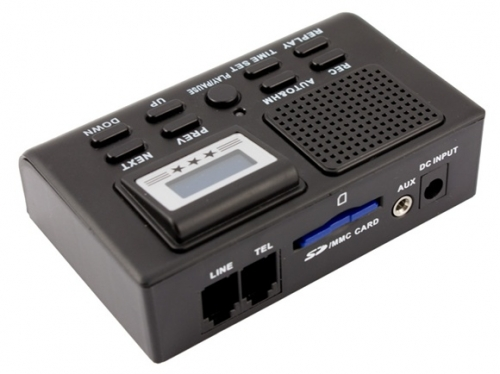
Telephone recorder, is hardware that can be used to record telephone conversations to a harddrive, SD-card, or tape.

Call recording hardware, or a telephone recorder, is hardware that can be used to record telephone conversations. Call recording hardware is most often used by law enforcement, lawyers, journalist, and call centers to record phone transaction with customers.

== History ==
Recording of telephone conversations in wired systems requires physical access to the lines over which calls are carried.

PBX based call-recording hardware is sold by PBX vendors and third parties. This hardware is attached to the PBX. It can be configured to record all calls or some calls, either randomly or on demand. Businesses, particularly call centers, use call recording for training, quality management, and legal compliance.

Consumer call-recording hardware was introduced in the 1970s, along with the first consumer-grade answering machines. These devices were connected to the same physical line as one of the telephones involved in the conversation. While the more sophisticated devices were automatically activated when a call was made, most were manual.

Modern call recorders can use computer servers, running Microsoft Windows or other operating systems, using interface cards designed for TDM T1 and ISDN-PRI trunks for trunk side recording, and analog and digital station side cards for recording from stations. Often client software is required by the user computer for both screen recording and to trigger voice recording. SIP trunk calls can be recorded using port spans installed on specially configured network ports that do not have IP addresses and are used as sniffers for SIP traffic, and can be configured to record all or only specific calls.

== Uses ==
There are many requirements for call recording. Depending upon jurisdiction, the recording party may or may not be required to tell the other party that the call is being recorded. A simple example whereby anybody might want to record a call is to note complex instructions, or simply to be able to return to a conversation whose details have been forgotten. Both private individuals and companies may want to make an audio recording of transactions for which there is no written record.

=== Commerce ===
Recording of commercial transactions by companies is often advised, and may be required.

=== Law enforcement ===
Law enforcement use of call recording hardware is concentrated in two areas:

1. Security recording of intercepted domestic and international calls for the prevention and detection of crime. Several US government agencies record calls as legally permitted. Hardware used in this application generally consists of large banks of servers and disk arrays.
2. Emergency and public service calls, for example to police. In the US with the advent of E-911 and P.25 projects, E-911 call centers and Public Service Access Points (PSAPs) are upgrading their recording hardware. Newer systems include hardware interfaces to improve interoperability and compatibility with radio systems outside the PSAP (e.g. military radios). Newer law-enforcement recording systems include hardware interfaces to these radios.

== Types ==
=== Tape ===
Tape recorders, like answering machines, are installed between the telephone wall socket and the telephone itself. Telephone calls flow through the recorder. If the recorder is on, the call is recorded on magnetic tape, and can be played back on compatible devices. Cassette tape recorders are used for small-scale use. Professional reel-to-reel recorders taking large tape spools and running at low tape speeds such as 15/16 inch per second (2.38 cm/s) were used for large-scale routine recording.

=== Digital ===
Digital recorders have largely replaced tape recorders. They work in the same way, but record calls in digitised form onto digital data storage media. Some digital recorders can record call metadata such as call time and duration, and caller ID.

Functions may include:

- The ability to copy files onto removable media such as memory sticks,
- automatic upload to a computer, and
- automated transcriptions of recorded calls.

=== Computer ===
Calls may be directly recorded on a computer, without using separate recording hardware. typically a personal computer can be equipped with a sound board through which calls can be run. Calls can be terminated on a standard telephone or the PC itself. Calls and call metadata are store on the PC's hard drive. PC-based call-recording usually includes software to retrieve and listen to recorded calls.

=== Services ===
Call-recording services make it possible for consumers and businesses to record their telephone calls without any hardware. These services are available on demand. They centralize recordings, usually making them available through a web portal, facilitating retrieval and review. Call transcription services are available whereby a recorded call can be transcribed automatically to text, with the different speakers identified, either by software or, more accurately but at greater expense, by a person.

== See also ==
- Telephone tapping
- Call-recording software
- Voicemail
- Visual voicemail
- Business telephone system
