= WVS =

WVS may refer to:

- Women's Royal Voluntary Service (WRVS)
- World Values Survey, a global research project that explores people's values and beliefs
- Worldwide Veterinary Service
- Warwickshire Vision Support, a UK charity providing support for people with sight loss in Warwickshire
- A virtual scripting language based on XML.
- WebSphere Voice Server, a Speech Recognition product from IBM that provides automatic ASR and TTS functions for solutions supporting MRCP or Media Resource Control Protocol.
