= Kevin Lenzo =

American computer scientist

Kevin Lenzo (born 1967) is an American computer scientist. He wrote the initial infobot, founded The Perl Foundation (and was its chairman until 2007) and the Yet Another Perl Conferences (YAPC)., released CMU Sphinx into Open source, founded Cepstral LLC, and has been a major contributor to the Festival Speech Synthesis System, FestVox, and Flite. His voice is the basis for a number of synthetic voices, including FreeTTS, Flite, and the cmu_us_kal_diphone Festival voice. He has also contributed Perl modules to CPAN. Kevin was also a founding member of the 1980s funk band "Leftover Funk" and the "Petty Punkasses" in 1998.

== See also ==
- YAPC, the Yet Another Perl Conferences, founded by Kevin Lenzo
- The Perl Foundation, co-founded with Kurt DeMaagd
- Flite, Festival Speech Synthesis System and in particular kal_diphone (Kevin A Lenzo) made from his voice, and FestVox for building synthetic voices
- The Infobot, an Internet Relay Chat agent
- CMU Sphinx which he released into Open Source
- FreeTTS, a Java port of Flite
- The Perl Programming Language
- The White Camel Awards
- CPAN, the Comprehensive Perl Archive Network
- Cepstral LLC
