= Dubber =

Australian SaaS company

Dubber Corporation
- Type: Public
- Traded as: ASX: DUB
- Industry: Technology
- Founded: 2011
- Founder: James Slaney, Steve McGovern, Adrian Di Pietrantonio
- Headquarters: Melbourne, Australia
- Area served: Worldwide
- Website: www.dubber.net

Dubber is a cloud based call recording software which operates as a software-as-service (SaaS) and voice data offering. Dubber was founded in Melbourne, Australia in 2011 by James Slaney, Steve McGovern and Adrian Di Pietrantonio, and predominantly sells to Telecommunications Service Providers and Enterprise customers.

== History ==
In 2015, Dubber listed on the Australian Stock Exchange (ASX) under the code DUB.

In May 2015, Dubber passed a series of interoperability tests with BroadSoft's unified communications software. This combined solution allowed users to deploy call recording on top of their BroadSoft network without the need of any additional hardware. Following this news, in June 2015, Dubber announced growth of 141% in users for the first half of that year.

In 2016 Dubber announced a partnership with Cisco Broadsoft. A year later, in October 2017, Cisco announced that they would acquire Broadsoft.

Dubber's technology is used by many large service providers and cloud communication and collaboration providers around the world to embed call recording and voice data services into their unified communication and other services, including AT&T, IBM, Optus, Telstra, Cox Communications, Sprint, the UK's 02, and others.

In October 2022, Dubber's shares were suspended from trading for failing to lodge their audited accounts. When their audited results were released it was disclosed that their revenue for FY22 had been overstated by $10.3m or 29%

In February 2023, Dubber announced a business restructure which would result in layoffs of 40% of their employees.

In February 2024, Dubber's shares were again suspended from trading after their auditors found that $30m of funds shown on their unaudited accounts as a "term deposit" had been diverted away and "used for other purposes". The CEO Steve McGovern was suspended amid an investigation and the matter referred to ASIC.

In March 2024, ASIC secured interim travel restraint orders against CEO Steve McGovern and solicitor Mark Madafferi due to concerns that they may have breached the Corporations Act in respect of the suspected misuse of term deposit funds.

When Dubber released its interim financial for the half year ended December 2023 on 14 April 2024, it revealed that $60m of funds had been deposited in the trust account between 2019 and 2021. Despite finding that "certain personnel" of the company and associated entities had been recipients of payments from this trust fund, Dubber took no action in relation to any of these personnel. It did find that there was sufficient evidence to terminate the employment of CEO Steve McGovern with immediate effect.

When Dubber's shares resumed trading on April 17, 2024, after a seven-week suspension, their price crashed by 75%, one of the worst share price falls in the history of the ASX.

Reporting by The Age in June 2024 revealed that $75m of cash had been moved from Dubber to a trust account held by the law firm of Mark Madafferi, who was known for providing legal services to "some of Melbourne’s most well-known gangland identities, including convicted killers and drug dealers". The Age alleged that forensic accountants had identified at least one transfer from the trust account to "an underworld figure".

== Technology ==
Dubber's call recording and voice data solutions are natively hosted in the cloud, allowing its services to be embedded in third party telecommunication and cloud collaboration (UCaaS) solutions. Dubber utilises API's to integrate call recording data into third-party software and telecommunications services.

Dubber's call recording services achieved certification for compliance call recording on Microsoft Teams, in February 2021.

In April 2021, Dubber announced that its call recording and voice AI service would interoperate with Zoom and Zoom Phone.

In June 2021, Dubber launched its foundation partner program, a significant expansion of its product model whereby telecommunications carriers and UCaaS services can embed the Dubber call recording service in all user accounts. Cisco Webex Calling and Cisco Unified Communications Manager Cloud (UCM) were the first such services launched on the program.

On 2 Dec 2021, the company announced an agreement with BT (formerly British Telecom) whereby BT would use Dubber as their default recording and conversational solution in the BT Meetings suite of managed services, including Microsoft Teams, Cisco Webex Calling and Zoom Phone.

On 13 December 2021, Dubber and Optus announced that they would include the Dubber platform on the Optus Mobile network to provide the Dubber platform for enterprise customers in Australia.

== Acquisitions ==
Dubber announced its first acquisition in May 2020, acquiring Australian-based on-premise call recording company CallN. CallN was previously partly owned by Telstra.

Dubber acquired UK based Speik, a leading provider of PCI compliance and call recording solutions in the UK in December 2020 for A$38 million.

In September 2021, Dubber announced that it had acquired Brisbane, Australia based Notiv, a developer of cloud-native AI-based products that turn meetings into transcribed notes, summaries, signals, and other actions.
