= RealCall =

Mobile phone application

- Original author: Second Phone Number Inc.
- Developer: Second Phone Number Inc.
- Operating system: Android and iOS
- Available in: English
- Type: Telephone directory; Caller ID; Spam blocker
- License: Freeware
- Website: www.realcall.ai

RealCall is a US-based AI caller identification and call blocking smartphone application, used to detect, engage and block call and SMS scamming and spamming. It has AI algorithms with built-in free reverse phone lookup service and customized answer bots for detection, engagement and blocking of unwanted calls and messages. The app is available for Android and iOS devices.

== Overview ==
RealCall is a US based AI smartphone application, to detect, engage and block spam calls, with a database of known numbers and an AI algorithm to identify phone numbers and block calls from robocallers, spammers, telemarketers and scammers. It analyze caller's voice and call's content to determine the nature of a call. The app auto block unwanted calls, and use answer bots to answer calls from telemarketers. It has reverse lookup service, used to find owner name, address, network carrier, location, risk level of unknown numbers, and system integrated with FTC Do Not Call Registry.

== History ==
RealCall is developed by Second Phone Number Inc., a privately held company with a head office in San Jose, California, US. It released first iOS version of the app on 6 April 2022, and Android version in December 2022. As of September 2022, it has blocked 30.63 million spam calls and 11.6 billion spam text messages, originating mainly from 530, 502, 626, 915, and 315 US area codes. In November 2022, Dingtone announced partnership with RealCall and integrated its API. As of 2022, It has collected 1.5 billion phone numbers in its global database.

== Availability ==
The app is only available in US and Canada, for iOS and Android users.

== See also ==
- Truecaller
- CallApp
