= MRCP =

MRCP may be:

- Magnetic resonance cholangiopancreatography, in medical imaging, a technique to visualise the biliary tract and pancreatic ducts.
- Membership of the Royal Colleges of Physicians of the United Kingdom, a postgraduate medical diploma run by the Federation of the Medical Royal Colleges of the United Kingdom
- Media Resource Control Protocol, in computer systems, a communication protocol used by speech servers to provide various speech services
- Master of Regional and City Planning, a variant of Master of Urban Planning
- Movement Related Cortical Potentials - an activity in the motor cortex and supplementary motor area of the brain leading up to voluntary muscle movement
