= LumenVox =

- Type: Private
- Industry: Telecommunications
- Founded: 2001
- Founder: Edward Miller
- Headquarters: San Diego, California, U.S.
- Key people: Edward Miller, Founder and Chief Executive Officer
- Products: speech recognition

LumenVox is a privately held speech recognition software company based in San Diego, California. LumenVox has been described as one of the market leaders in the speech recognition software industry.

== History ==
LumenVox was founded in 2001 as subsidiary of Progressive Computing. According to LumenVox CEO Edward Miller, when Progressive had initially looked to add speech recognition to its own phone system, it found the existing offerings too expensive and recognized a niche in the market for a more affordable speech recognition product. This led to the development of LumenVox with an aim to bring speech recognition to small-to-midsized businesses.

LumenVox is one of the major providers of automatic speech recognition for telephone systems, and as of 2006, became the second largest provider of speech recognition software.

== Products ==
The primary LumenVox product is the LumenVox Speech Engine. It is a speaker-independent automatic speech recognizer that uses the Speech Recognition Grammar Specification for building and defining grammars. It has been integrated with several of the major voice platforms, including Avaya Voice Portal/Interactive Response, Aculab, and BroadSoft's BroadWorks. The Speech Engine was originally derived from CMU Sphinx, but LumenVox has added considerable development effort to make it a commercial-ready product.

== Open source support ==
LumenVox was recognized as one of the top VoIP companies in 2008 for its work in providing its offerings to the open source community, an effort by the company that began in 2006 when it partnered with Digium. At that time, Digium, maintainer of the open source Asterisk PBX, integrated the LumenVox Speech Engine into Asterisk. This made LumenVox the first commercially available speech recognition engine for Asterisk.

As one of the earlier commercial software integrations with Asterisk, the LumenVox integration has been described as one of the applications that helped to mainstream Asterisk.

In 2009, LumenVox also began offering access to the Speech Engine as a monthly subscription, bringing the cost of entry down even lower for open source users.

LumenVox is also integrated with the open source UniMRCP project, which provides open source client and server libraries for the Media Resource Control Protocol.

== See also ==
- List of speech recognition software
