= SVOX =

- Company type: Private
- Industry: Speech Processing, Natural Language Processing
- Predecessor: SVOX GmbH
- Founded: 2000 (GmbH), 2001 (AG)
- Founder: Volker Jantzen; Christof Traber (GmbH); Bettina Hein; Thomas Benz (AG)
- Headquarters: Zurich, Switzerland
- Area served: Worldwide
- Key people: Martin Reber, (CEO)
- Products: Speech Recognition (ASR), Speech Output (TTS), Speech Dialog
- Number of employees: 90 (2009)

SVOX is an embedded speech technology company founded in 2000 and headquartered in Zurich, Switzerland. SVOX was acquired by Nuance Communications in 2011. The company's products included Automated Speech Recognition (ASR), Text-to-Speech (TTS) and Speech Dialog systems, with customers mostly being manufacturers and system integrators in automotive and mobile device industries.

== History ==
SVOX was started in 2000 by researchers at Federal Institute of Technology Zurich (ETH Zurich) and first focused exclusively on Speech Output (TTS) solutions for automotive industry.

In 2002, Siemens Mobile Acceleration (today's smac|partners GmbH) invested into SVOX.

Later, as the market for Personal Navigation Devices and smartphones developed, the company started to supply those markets as well. In 2008, SVOX released Pico, a small-footprint TTS system optimized for mobile phones.

In parallel, SVOX has branched into Speech Recognition and Speech Dialog. As part of that process, the company acquired Professional Speech Processing Group of Siemens AG in early 2009.

In 2009, SVOX made headlines with news that Google had chosen to include the company's Pico TTS solution into the 1.6 release of Android platform.

In June 2011, Nuance Communications acquired SVOX.

== Products ==
SVOX products include Automated Speech Recognition (ASR), Text-to-Speech (TTS) and Speech Dialog systems. Typical uses include:

- destination entry and voice directions in turn-by-turn navigation systems;
- voice dialing and caller ID announcement in mobile phones and in-car telematics systems;
- Point of Interest (POI) output and traffic information in navigation systems (PND and in-car).

The company's speech products are especially popular with German carmakers such as Audi, Porsche, BMW, Daimler, and VW and are often found in premium cars.

== See also ==
- Comparison of speech synthesizers
