= Blocked call =

Blocked call may refer to:

- Caller ID blocking
- Call blocking
- Blocking probability
