= Alan W. Black =

Scottish computer scientist

Alan W Black
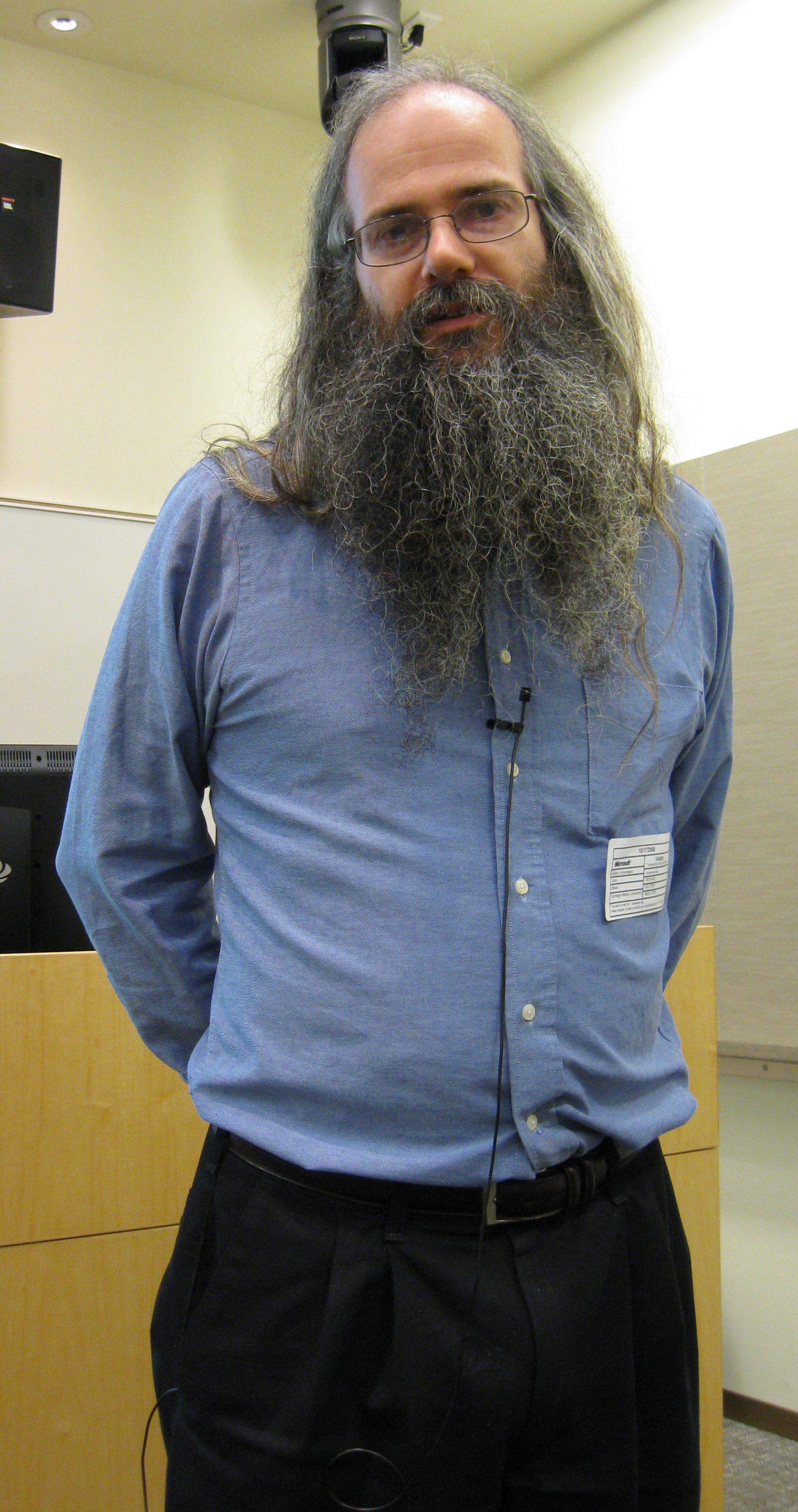
- Alan W Black
- Born: Scotland
- Education: University of Edinburgh; Coventry University
- Known for: Speech synthesis
- Scientific career
- Fields: Computer science
- Workplaces: Carnegie Mellon University
- Doctoral advisor: Robin Cooper and Graeme Ritchie

Alan W Black is a Scottish computer scientist, known for his research on speech synthesis. He is a retired professor in the Language Technologies Institute at Carnegie Mellon University in Pittsburgh, Pennsylvania.

Black did his undergraduate studies at Coventry University, graduating in 1984. He earned a master's degree from the University of Edinburgh in 1986 and a Ph.D. from the same university in 1993. After working at the Advanced Telecommunications Research Institute International in Kansai Science City, Japan and at the University of Edinburgh, he took a research faculty position at Carnegie Mellon in 1999. In 2008 he became a regular faculty member with tenure at CMU, and in June of 2022, he retired from being a full-time professor.

Black wrote the Festival Speech Synthesis System at Edinburgh, and continues to develop it at Carnegie Mellon. He has also worked on machine translation of speech at CMU, and is the co-founder and was chief scientist at Cepstral, a Pittsburgh-based speech translation technology company.
