= Cepstral (company) =

Cepstral LLC
- Industry: Speech synthesis
- Founded: June 2000
- Founder: Kevin Lenzo, Alan W. Black
- Headquarters: Pittsburgh, Pennsylvania
- Products: Cepstral Text-To-Speech
- Website: http://www.cepstral.com

Cepstral is a provider of speech synthesis technology and services. It was founded in June 2000 by scientists from Carnegie Mellon University including the computer scientists Kevin Lenzo and Alan W. Black. It is a privately held corporation with headquarters in Pittsburgh, Pennsylvania.

The company primarily produces synthetic voices to be used in telephony systems, mobile applications, desktop applications, and with other TTS software such as open-source Festival.

== See also ==
- Cepstrum
- Kevin Lenzo
- Alan W. Black
- Speech synthesis
