= Java Speech API =

API for speech synthesizers on the Java platform

The Java Speech API (JSAPI) was a application programming interface for cross-platform support of command and control recognizers, dictation systems, and speech synthesizers. Although JSAPI defines an interface only, there are several implementations created by third parties, for example FreeTTS. It was never integrated into Java SE or Java EE.

It is now an obsolete library, having last been updated in 2006.

== Core technologies ==
Two core speech technologies are supported through the Java Speech API: speech synthesis and speech recognition.

=== Speech synthesis ===
Speech synthesis provides the reverse process of producing synthetic speech from text generated by an application, an applet, or a user. It is often referred to as text-to-speech technology.

The major steps in producing speech from text are as follows:

- Structure analysis: Processes the input text to determine where paragraphs, sentences, and other structures start and end. For most languages, punctuation and formatting data are used in this stage.
- Text pre-processing: Analyzes the input text for special constructs of the language. In English, special treatment is required for abbreviations, acronyms, dates, times, numbers, currency amounts, e-mail addresses, and many other forms. Other languages need special processing for these forms, and most languages have other specialized requirements.

The result of these first two steps is a spoken form of the written text. Here are examples of the differences between written and spoken text:

St. Matthew's hospital is on Main St.
-> “Saint Matthew's hospital is on Main Street”

Add $20 to account 55374.
-> “Add twenty dollars to account five five, three seven four.”

The remaining steps convert the spoken text to speech:

- Text-to-phoneme conversion: Converts each word to phonemes. A phoneme is a basic unit of sound in a language.
- Prosody analysis: Processes the sentence structure, words, and phonemes to determine the appropriate prosody for the sentence.
- Waveform production: Uses the phonemes and prosody information to produce the audio waveform for each sentence.

Speech synthesizers can make errors in any of the processing steps described above. Human ears are well-tuned to detecting these errors, but careful work by developers can minimize errors and improve the speech output quality.

=== Speech recognition ===
Speech recognition provides computers with the ability to listen to spoken language and determine what has been said. In other words, it processes audio input containing speech by converting it to text.

The major steps of a typical speech recognizer are as follows:

- Grammar design: Defines the words that may be spoken by a user and the patterns in which they may be spoken.
- Signal processing: Analyzes the spectrum (i.e., the frequency) characteristics of the incoming audio.
- Phoneme recognition: Compares the spectrum patterns to the patterns of the phonemes of the language being recognized.
- Word recognition: Compares the sequence of likely phonemes against the words and patterns of words specified by the active grammars.
- Result generation: Provides the application with information about the words the recognizer has detected in the incoming audio.

A grammar is an object in the Java Speech API that indicates what words a user is expected to say and in what patterns those words may occur. Grammars are important to speech recognizers because they constrain the recognition process. These constraints make recognition faster and more accurate because the recognizer does not have to check for bizarre sentences.

The Java Speech API 1 supports two basic grammar types: rule grammars and dictation grammars. These types differ in various ways, including how applications set up the grammars; the types of sentences they allow; how results are provided; the amount of computational resources required; and how they are used in application design. Rule grammars are defined in JSAPI 1 by JSGF, the Java Speech Grammar Format.

== The Java Speech API's classes and interfaces ==
The different classes and interfaces that form the Java Speech API are grouped into the following three packages:

- javax.speech: Contains classes and interfaces for a generic speech engine.
- javax.speech.synthesis: Contains classes and interfaces for speech synthesis.
- javax.speech.recognition: Contains classes and interfaces for speech recognition.

The javax.speech.EngineManager class is like a factory class used by all Java Speech API applications. It provides static methods to enable access to speech synthesis and speech recognition engines. The javax.speech.Engine interface encapsulates the generic operations that a Java Speech API-compliant speech engine should provide for speech applications.

Speech applications can primarily use methods to perform actions such as retrieving the properties and state of the speech engine and allocating and deallocating resources for a speech engine. In addition, the javax.speech.Engine interface exposes mechanisms to pause and resume the audio stream generated or processed by the speech engine. The javax.speech.AudioManager can manipulate streams. The javax.speech.Engine interface is extended by the javax.speech.synthesis.Synthesizer and javax.speech.recognition.Recognizer interfaces, which define additional speech synthesis and speech recognition functionality. The javax.speech.synthesis.Synthesizer interface encapsulates a Java Speech API-compliant speech synthesis engine's operations for speech applications.

The Java Speech API is based on event handling. Events generated by the speech engine can be identified and handled as required. Speech events can be handled through the javax.speech.EngineListener interface, specifically through the javax.speech.recognition.RecognizerListener and the javax.speech.synthesis.SynthesizerListener.

== Related Specifications ==
The Java Speech API was written before the Java Community Process (JCP) and targeted the Java Platform, Standard Edition (Java SE). Subsequently, the Java Speech API 2 (JSAPI2) was created as JSR 113 under the JCP. This API targets the Java Platform, Micro Edition (Java ME), but also complies with Java SE.

== See also ==
- Jakarta EE
