= VoIP recording =

Voice over Internet Protocol (VoIP) recording is a subset of telephone recording or voice logging, first used by call centers and now being used by all types of businesses. There are many reasons for recording voice over IP call traffic such as: reducing company vulnerability to lawsuits by maintaining recorded evidence, complying with telephone call recording laws, increasing security, employee training and performance reviews, enhancing employee control and alignment, verifying data, sharing data as well as customer satisfaction and enhancing call center agent morale.

== Operation ==
By definition, Voice over IP is audio converted into digital packets and then converted to IP packets. VoIP recording is accomplished either by sniffing the network or by having the packets duplicated and directed to the recorder—passive recording or active recording, respectively.

- Sniffing (passive recording) is done by connecting to the switched port analyzer (SPAN) port which allows the VoIP recording unit to monitor all network traffic and pick out only the VoIP traffic to record by either MAC address or by IP address. This is usually done by connecting an Ethernet cable being between the VoIP recording unit and the router, switch, or hub. Via the SPAN port, the recorder will "sniff" for signaling and RTP (Real Time Protocol) packets that have the identifying information contained in the headers of the packets is designated to record. There are two main ways to capture the RTP packets with the SPAN port. One can SPAN the VoIP Gateway port, giving all the in/out bound traffic and offers one point of contact for recording. This is especially helpful in a campus with phones in multiple locations across the campus. However, this method cannot capture internal, peer-to-peer (phone to phone) calls because their VoIP traffic is sent directly between the phones and doesn't flow through the gateway port.
- Duplication and redirection requires setting up a VLAN and including all the phones within the VLAN. Then SPAN that VLAN. This will allow recording all in/out bound traffic and internal traffic. The disadvantage is that not all phones at times are on a VLAN or the same VLAN, so multiple SPANS are needed. Another method is to use a concept called RSPAN (remote SPAN), in which the VLAN's that are set to SPAN are trunked across switches to a receiving switch.

== Challenges ==
VoIP is usually implemented as a cost-saving measure over POTS (Plain old telephone systems). The same holds true now for VoIP recording. Most recording vendors are able to record the various standards of VoIP such as G.711, G.729a/b and G.723 and software-only solutions as compared to the intensive hardware and software associated with legacy PBX recording.

Today, most of the VoIP vendors are offering VoIP recording methods specific to their VoIP call and communications management servers. These vendors are offering what is referred to as active VoIP recording where the recording vendor's solution becomes an "active" participant within the call for recording purposes. This approach offers some benefits over the long established method of sniffing (Passive) recording in environments where the handsets to be recorded are off site or in remote locations, or in situations where the network routing would mean that a passive solution would be overcomplicated. It also greatly simplifies recording internal calls, as it no longer necessary to duplicate the audio streamed between two handsets to the voice recorder as the telephony system will automatically manage this in any solution.

Disadvantages of "active" call recordings can include overheads on the PBX, the need for agent interaction and changes to the quality of the call. "Passive" call-recording software works by using packet filter technology to listen for VoIP calls on the LAN on a monitored port. The RTP stream is then captured and converted to a WAV file for storage and retrieval.

== Other methods ==
VoIP calls can be recorded via streaming audio recording applications. Most call centers and other organizations required to record calls would more often use a recording system offered by the softphone or IP PBX. Streaming audio recorders can be useful for home-based recording.

== See also ==
- Telephone tapping
