= Bzigo =

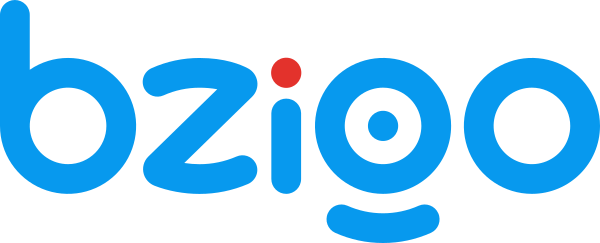
- Type: Private
- Industry: Autonomous devices
- Founded: 2016
- Headquarters: Delaware, U.S.
- Products: Consumer technology
- Website: bzigo.com

Bzigo is a technology startup company that develops autonomous devices for pest control. The company was founded by Nadav Benedek and Saar Wilf, who are both alumni of the Israel Defense Forces' intelligence Unit 8200.

== Technology ==
The Bzigo device scans a room for mosquitoes using specialized optics and computer vision algorithms to identify flight patterns. Once it detects that a mosquito has landed, the device marks its location with a pointer and sends a message to a phone application, allowing the recipient to locate the pest and kill it.
