= Saar Wilf =

Israeli innovator

- סער וילף
- Born: 1974 or 1975 (age 50–51); Tel Aviv, Israel
- Occupations: Entrepreneur; Investor; Poker Player

Saar Wilf (Hebrew: סער וילף; born 1974 or 1975) is an Israeli entrepreneur, businessman, angel investor and poker player who provides capital for start-up businesses.

== Career ==
Wilf, like his older sister Einat Wilf, attended high school at the Hebrew University Secondary School. Wilf served in the Israel Defense Forces' intelligence Unit 8200. He initially worked as a developer and programmer.

Wilf's first start-up, in 1997, was Trivnet.com, a payments company, which was sold to Gemalto in 2010. His second start-up was Fraud Sciences Ltd, which was acquired by eBay through PayPal in 2008 for $169 million, where he worked until 2010.

By 2017, he invested in about 15 companies. His companies have included ClarityRay (acquired by Yahoo), Pointgrab, Deep Optics. and CallApp, Crosswise (acquired by Oracle), Supersonic (merged with IronSource). As of 2014, Wilf was the chairman of Wikiwand, a mobile app and web browser extension for Wikipedia.

Bzigo, that he co-founded in 2016, has developed a machine which scans a room for mosquitos and tells mobile phones where they are, describing itself as "an Iron Dome for mosquitos". In 2020, its machines were scheduled for delivery to customers in 2021.

In 2017, Wilf founded Rootclaim, which uses probabilistic analysis to predict the likely solution to questions about controversial events such as war crimes, murder cases, and airline crashes. For example, it attributes the 2013 Ghouta chemical attack in Syria to the Syrian opposition and the downing of Malaysia Airlines Flight 17 to the Russia-aligned Donetsk People's Republic.

In 2018, he founded payments system Quahl (originally known as Initiative Q), backed by American economist Lawrence H. White and branded a "pyramid scheme with grandiose ideas" by the Financial Times. However, Mashable disagreed explaining "The important bit is that there's no money changing hands here". Seven million users had signed up within a year.

Wilf donated $100,000 to fund the Brain Preservation Foundation Prize, which was won on 13 March 2018.

Wilf has been playing Poker since 2005, with career earnings of over $1.3 Million as of 2023.
