= VSI Translation & Subtitling BV =

VSI Amsterdam
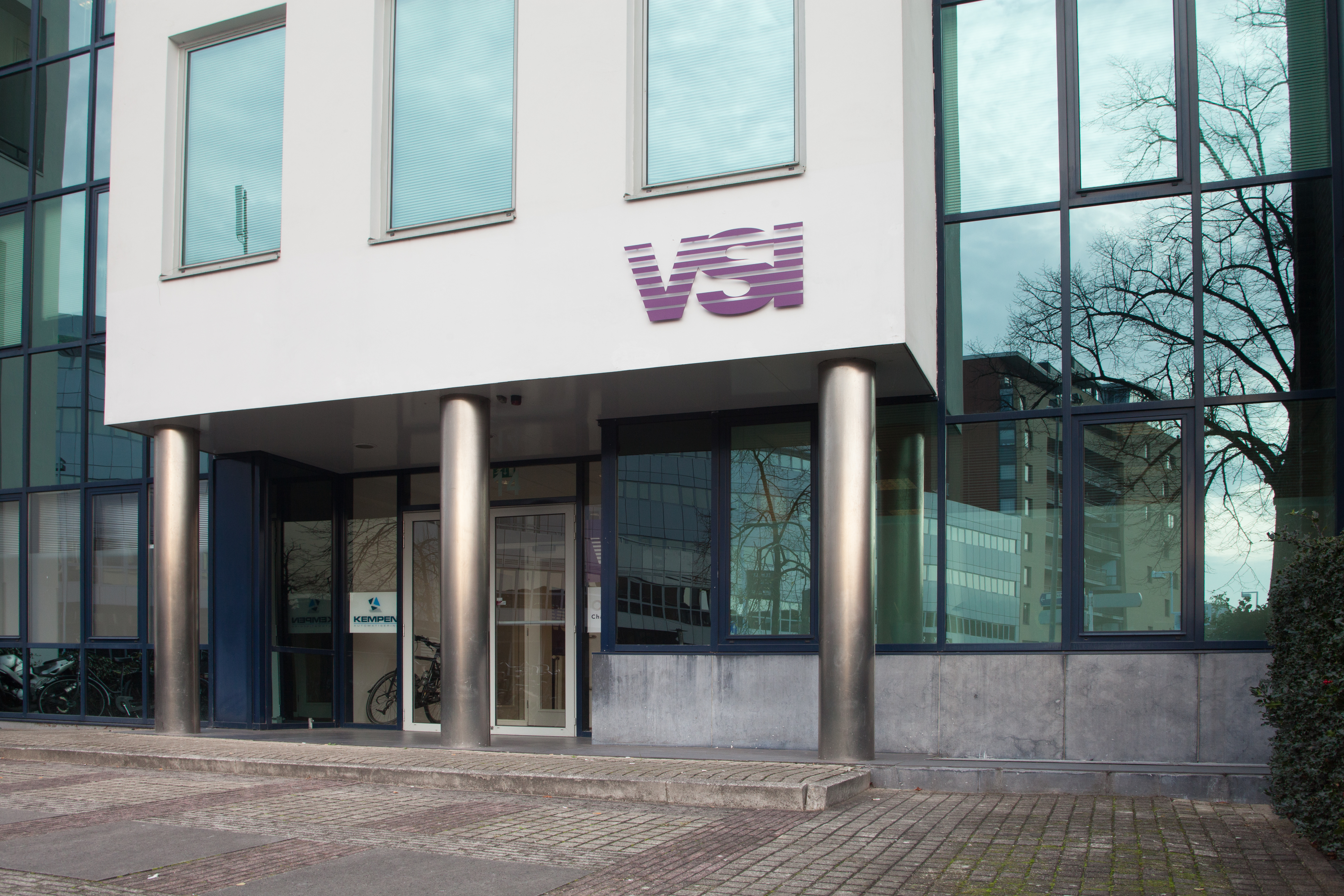
- VSI Amsterdam office
- Founded: 2001
- Founders: Norman Dawood & Ron van Broekhoven
- Products: dubbing, subtitle captioning, voice-over, translation and post-production services
- Website: vsi-amsterdam.tv

VSI Amsterdam is a provider of subtitle captioning, voice-over, translation and post-production services within the broadcast and corporate communications industries.

VSI Amsterdam is part of the VSI Group. This Group consists of 21 studios and production facilities worldwide.

== History ==
VSI Amsterdam was set up in 2001 by Managing Director of the VSI Group, Norman Dawood, and Ron van Broekhoven. The company has developed into one of Holland's leading subtitling and translation companies.

In 2015 VSI joined forces with Wim Pel Productions, a leading audio post-production company. A year later VSI took over the editing and dubbing activities of Hoek & Sonépouse and introduced VSI Creative Services.

VSI Amsterdam has offices and studios in Diemen (VSI Creative Services) and Hilversum (Translation & Subtitling BV), media capital of The Netherlands.

== See also ==
- vidby
- NeoSpeech
