= VSI Berlin GmbH =

German language service provider

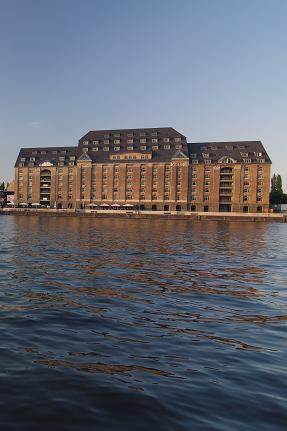
- Founded: 2005
- Founders: Norman Dawood & Ulrike Schubert
- Products: dubbing, subtitle captioning, voice-over, translation and post-production services
- Website: Official Website

VSI Berlin GmbH is a German language service provider with dubbing studios and subtitling facilities, based in the historical Osthafen area in central Berlin.

== History ==
In 2005, the British language service provider, Voice & Script International Ltd, opened up a branch in Germany, offering subtitling and voice-over facilities in the centre of Berlin. In 2007, it expanded its services by adding a German dubbing division. In 2011, both companies merged to form VSI Berlin GmbH.

Under the leadership of Ulrike Schubert and Norman Dawood,, the company offers dubbing, voice-over and subtitling of multilingual projects, as well as preparation of broadcast material, video editing and access services for television.

VSI Berlin GmbH is part of the VSI Group, which consists of 21 studios and production facilities worldwide.

== See also ==
- vidby
- NeoSpeech
- Duolingo
