= Clarify Op3nvoice =

Software company in United Kingdom

OP3Nvoice Ltd.
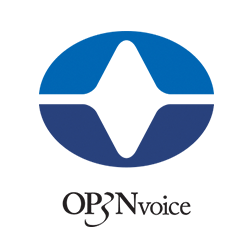
- Company type: privately held
- Industry: Internet; Software; Telecommunications
- Founded: 1 January 2011
- Founder: Paul Murphy
- Headquarters: London, United Kingdom; Austin, United States
- Area served: United States, United Kingdom
- Key people: Paul Murphy (CEO and Founder)
- Website: www.op3nvoice.com

Clarify (Formerly known as Op3nvoice) is a conversation intelligence platform that synthesizes all 3 forms of dialogue (audio, written and video) so that this data can be used to improve compliance, productivity, and intelligence applications.

Clarify enables customers to monitor audio, video and text conversations across channels including fixed lines, mobile and Skype and search to locate conversation data quickly.

The Clarify platform offers APIs that make voice and video data searchable by translating its audio to text. The software is targeted at developers and businesses wishing to turn any unstructured audio data (recordings of meetings, for instance, or audio books, phone calls, conferences, interviews, and so on) into data their business can analyse and act upon.

== API ==
Clarify.io API, SDKs and plugins enable anyone to extract data from video and voice recordings. The API was released in October 2014 and is in use by disruptors, innovators and some of the world's largest institutions.

== History ==
Paul Murphy, Clarify CEO and founder said the idea came out of another business that he founded in 2011, called CallTrunk. That was a phone call recording platform for consumers. While users liked the service they complained they couldn't find their call recordings — so the idea for building an audio search was born. (See ARGO Search)

== Reach ==
Rather than build products and apps itself Clarify integrates its software into existing platforms, and can already be seen in action on educational video platforms like Mobento.

Mobento was the first platform that made Clarify realize it could utilize its ARGOsearch technology on video as well as pure audio files.
