= Infobot =

IRC bot written in Perl, free software

- Original author: Kevin Lenzo
- Initial release: 1995; 30 years ago
- Stable release: 1.5.3 / August 1, 2008; 17 years ago
- Written in: Perl
- Operating system: Unix-like
- Type: IRC bot
- License: Artistic License
- Website: infobot.sourceforge.net

Infobot is a Perl IRC bot, first written in 1995 by Kevin Lenzo. The bot's main goal was to remember URLs and associate them with a descriptive name, so whenever someone needed a specific URL they could ask the bot. For that reason, the first Infobot, running in #macintosh on the EFnet IRC network, had the nickname 'url'.

Although the main project is now inactive, many forks from the original program were made, some of which are still active. Most of these forks carry extra features, such as googling a phrase given through the chat and saying the results of the query as messages directly in the chat.

== Operation ==
The Infobot works by a method of factoids. It stores information in its database by connecting a phrase with its definition, usually an informative short line. It records its information by constantly listening to the chat (which is configurable). It states its factoids when it recognizes a question in the chat. For example:

 <someone> wikipedia is https://www.wikipedia.org/

The Infobot at this point silently remembers the statement.

 <someone> wikipedia?
 <infobot> somebody said wikipedia is https://www.wikipedia.org/

Because of its ability to store statements and re-state them with ease, many IRC channel operators use an Infobot to store information such as the channel rules so they could easily give them to newcomers to the channel.

Using its automated replies, Infobots are also often used as an entertainment bot, giving humorous replies to certain queries. For example, to prevent the Infobot from saying 'X is Y', the key word '<REPLY>' is used, to have this effect:

 <someone> dumb bot is <REPLY>stupid human
 <someone> infobot: what's up?
 <infobot> huh?
 <someone> dumb bot
 <infobot> stupid human

== Derived bot projects ==
Infobots running the original Infobot code have become less popular on IRC now, mostly because of the inactivity of the original project. Newer Infobots have additional features. Most of them involve connecting to websites. For example, some bots have a 'weather' module. So someone can ask the Infobot the weather at a certain address, and the Infobot will connect to a weather site and report the up-to-date weather on the chat. Infobots are also useful as calculators, and in currency conversions, word definitions, and many other things which one would otherwise have to open a site for.

A notable fork was blootbot by Tim Riker. In 2008 it was merged back with the original infobot. The resulting code is now maintained under the original infobot name by Riker. It uses an SQL back-end such as MySQL, PGSQL, or SQLite to store factoids.
