= ARGOsearch =

Software company in United Kingdom

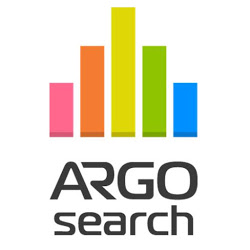
- Industry: Internet; Software; Telecommunications
- Founder: Paul Murphy, Angela Clarke
- Headquarters: London, United Kingdom
- Area served: United States, United Kingdom, Australia
- Key people: Paul Murphy (CEO and Co Founder)
- Website: www.argosearch.com

ARGOsearch is a software to search within recordings, such as audio recordings, call notes, transcriptions, and meta-data, for information including spoken words, phone numbers, and dates.

ARGOsearch is a spin-off from Calltrunk—a cloud-based call recording and call management business, developed on its OpenVoice platform.

== Products and Services ==
The ARGOsearch software records phone calls and searches them for verbal information, and is available on PC and mobile platforms.

Subscribers store spoken data from mobiles, landlines, Skype, or a Dictaphone, and upload them. They can then search the recorded conversations for dates, times, words, or phrases.

ARGOsearch is currently free, though an OP3Nvoice spokesman said the company would eventually charge for it. It works in Web browsers and on iPhone, and Android phones.

A beta version of the software is available in the United States, United Kingdom, and Australia.
