= Quahl =

Speculative payment network and digital currency

- Website type: Payment system
- Available in: English; Chinese; Arabic; Spanish; French; Portuguese; Russian; Japanese
- Founded: May 30, 2018; 8 years ago
- Headquarters: Tel Aviv-Yafo
- Owners: Initiative Q, LTD
- Founder: Saar Wilf
- Key people: Lawrence H. White; Marc Rysman; William J. Luther; Brendan Mackey; James Caton
- Website: quahl.com
- Registration: Invite only
- Native clients on: iOS, Android

Quahl (/kuːɑːl/ k-oo-ah-l), formerly known as Initiative Q, was an attempt to create a new payment network and digital currency. It was created by Israeli entrepreneur Saar Wilf, who previously founded Fraud Sciences, a payment security company acquired by PayPal. Quahl is backed by Cato Institute economist Lawrence H. White. The initiative has indicated it will not take measures to evade state regulation.

== Payment system ==
Quahl's goal was to create a new payment system rather than replace payment cards and paper money. It is "creating a new currency (Quahl) and distributing it to anyone who helps speed up adoption." Quahl is not a cryptocurrency and is not decentralized, but will instead be overseen by an independent monetary committee, similar to a central bank.

Since 2018 Quahl was giving away free amounts of Q currency to people who join the network, which is by invite only, and the amount of money drops as more people join the network and will stop on the launch date. It has been said that each Q has a value around one US dollar. "The more people join the network, the more value it has."

== Marketing and rollout ==
Registering for Quahl is marketed through multi-level marketing. The currency reserved for registrants will not be released until a critical mass of adopters identify themselves. In November 2018, Vox.com reported that more than two million people had signed up in 180 countries. Later the same month, O Globo reported more than five million registrations, and The Times of India reported that countries with large numbers of registrations included India, Brazil, United States and United Kingdom.

== Criticism ==
In October 2018, Frank Chung of news.com.au wrote that the marketing style could be "perceived as a scam or pyramid scheme" and Daniel Huszák of portfolio.hu compared it to multi-level marketing without the fee. Huszák enumerated potential problems with the scheme such as no clear crypto-currency security measures, unclear transaction/exchange costs, and potential for market manipulation by the largest holders of currency. Owen Gough of Digital Spy wrote "Is Initiative Q real or fake? Short answer – we have absolutely no idea."

In contrast, Brendan Markey-Tower, economist at the University of Queensland, said on Stuff.co.nz in November 2018 that it was "not a scam" and that the scheme wouldn't "make you fabulously wealthy. It is, nonetheless, an interesting idea."

== Cessation ==
In November 2021, Quahl's main site and app announced the pause of new subscriptions for now as the size of the community (10 million users) and its growth was not sufficient to launch a new currency. It said it was investigating possible ways to move forward in a way that would bring value to the community, and if it did not find a reasonable option, it would delete all user data. As of November 2022 the project is no longer live and all personal information has been permanently erased.
