= VSI Group =

- The headquarters of VSI Group in London
- Industry: Entertainment
- Founded: 1989; 37 years ago
- Founders: Norman Dawood
- Headquarters: 128 – 134 Cleveland Street, London, England
- Area served: Worldwide
- Products: dubbing, subtitle captioning, voice-over, translation and post-production services
- Website: vsi.tv

The VSI Group (Voice and Script International Ltd.) is a major provider of dubbing, subtitle captioning, voice-over, translation and post-production services within the broadcast and corporate communications industries.

The VSI Group consists of 24 studios and production facilities. VSI London, the Group's central hub and headquarters, is where most of the larger projects and international channel launches are managed.

Established in 1989, VSI employs over 250 staff and utilizes a network of approximately 3,500 freelance translators worldwide, localizing over 100,000 programme hours into over 40 languages each year.

In February 2013, the VSI Group and dcinex announced that they have entered into a commercial partnership aiming at providing one-stop-shop content services to movie distributors.

In the same month Cornelia Al-Khaled joined VSI London, head office of the VSI Group, as Managing Director.

In 2014, VSI was awarded Netflix Preferred Vendor status for timed text localisation services. In the following year VSI announced a partnership with WPP, a leading audio post-production company based in the Netherlands.

In 2016, VSI was named European Vendor of the Year for Timed Text localisation. Recipients of the Vendor of the Year award are selected amongst Netflix's group of Netflix Preferred Vendors (NPVs) and are recognised for outstanding achievements in performance and quality metrics. Shortly after this, the VSI Group was accepted into a new NPV Category for Netflix Originals localisation.

== History ==
VSI was set up in 1989 by Managing Director, Norman Dawood, and has been privately owned ever since.

Norman Dawood is the son of N. J. Dawood, the first translator of the Koran and the Tales from the Thousand and One Nights into modern English. VSI offers dubbing and subtitling and works closely with N. J. Dawood's translation company Aradco, based under the same roof.

VSI was the first Western company offering electronic subtitling in Chinese, Japanese and Korean.

== Branches ==
VSI has dubbing studios and subtitling offices in London, Paris, Berlin (VSI Berlin GmbH), Rome, Amsterdam (VSI Translation & Subtitling BV), Stockholm, Brussels, Barcelona, Madrid, Budapest, Ljubljana, Zagreb, Belgrade, Bucharest, Warsaw, Moscow, Istanbul, Tel Aviv, Cairo, Dubai, New York, Los Angeles, Buenos Aires, São Paulo (VSI Vox Mundi) and Mexico City.
