= FreeTTS =

Open source speech synthesis system

- Original authors: lamere ppk96 schnelle wwalker
- Initial release: December 14, 2001; 24 years ago
- Stable release: 1.2.2 / March 9, 2009; 16 years ago
- Written in: Java
- Platform: Java
- Size: 12.8 MB
- Available in: English
- Type: Speech synthesis
- License: BSD
- Website: freetts.sourceforge.net

FreeTTS is an open source speech synthesis system written entirely in the Java programming language. It is based upon Flite. FreeTTS is an implementation of Sun's Java Speech API.

FreeTTS supports end-of-speech markers. Gnopernicus uses these in a number of places: to know when text should and should not be interrupted, to better concatenate speech, and to sequence speech in different voices. Benchmarks conducted by Sun in 2002 on Solaris showed that FreeTTS ran two to three times faster than Flite at the time.

== History ==
As of June 2019, the newest version of that project originates from April 2017. Intensive development finished in March 2009 with release 1.2.2.

== See also ==
- Speech synthesis
- Festival
