= Calltrunk =

UK software company

Calltrunk Inc.
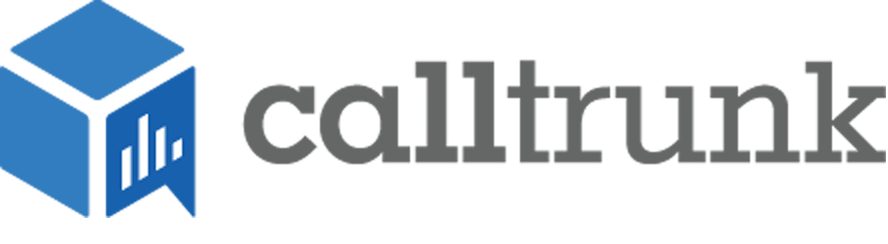
- Industry: Internet; Software; Telecommunications
- Founder: Paul Murphy, Angela Clarke
- Defunct: May 8, 2015
- Headquarters: London, United Kingdom
- Area served: United States, United Kingdom, Australia
- Key people: Paul Murphy (CEO and Co Founder)
- Website: www.calltrunk.com

Calltrunk is a self-service call management and call-recording solution built on the OP3Nvoice platform for consumers and corporates. Calltrunk has the ability to record and store conversations made via any phone, fixed line, mobile or VOIP (Voice over Internet) phone.

"Calltrunk" is headquartered in London, England, with offices in Dallas, Texas, US, and Montreal, Canada. The team consists of Paul Murphy (Founder & CEO), Angela Clarke (Founder & VP Product).

The company was started because the Calltrunk founders personally needed a cloud-based call recording service. With backgrounds in telephony and software, they built a company, Calltrunk, to fill the need. Richard Newton, Calltrunk's marketing director, says: "Companies record us, so why shouldn't we record them? If there's a dispute, they hold all the cards. We wanted to put power back into the hands of the consumer".

Calltrunk has global investment banks among its clients and recently secured nearly £2 Million in investment funding to outsource the ARGOsearch programme to large corporates.

== ARGOSearch ==
Calltrunk launched a conversation search engine application called ARGOsearch. The software, available for computers and mobile devices, enables users to record phone calls and search them for verbal information.

Subscribers store spoken data from mobiles, land lines, Skype or a dictaphone, and upload them into an online storage bank. They can then search the recorded conversations for dates, times, words or phrases.

The technology can struggle to cope with background noise and some regional accents, resulting in accuracy rates too low to make services acceptable to a mass audience. Calltrunk's word indexation accuracy is around 80%.

ARGOsearch enables individuals and small companies to capture, store and search conversations in the way that large companies already can.

While the regular Calltrunk service charges a monthly fee, ArgoSearch is currently free, though a Calltrunk spokesman said the company would eventually charge for it. It works in Web browsers and on the iPhone, and Android phones.

ARGOsearch is available in beta in the US, UK and Australia. Users can sign up via the Calltrunk website or through its mobile apps.

== Usability and file management ==
Calltrunk's products allows users to share and/or make recordings with Evernote, Box, Dropbox, Sugar CRM, download or order transcriptions.

All CallTrunk recordings can be accessed online via a browser or via Call Trunk's iPhone app. The recordings can also be shared on social networks or sent to Evernote, box or SugarCRM.

== Legalities ==
Calltrunk maintains that when recording conversations for private purposes - as long as that recording is not shared with a third party - only one person needs to be aware of, and consent to, the recording.

Anthony Lee, data protection and privacy expert at law firm Bircham Dyson Bell, agrees, but only up to a point. "This does not apply if you want to use a third party, such as a cloud service-provider, to store recordings, particularly if sensitive personal data is involved, or if the recording is to be stored on servers which are located outside of the European Economic Area," he says. "The informed consent and, sometimes, the explicit consent of the individual or individuals concerned, will typically be required. It will be interesting to see the practice which emerges here."

Calltrunk disagrees and believes the law is analogous to that covering email, which, technically speaking, requires the consent of the sender before you can forward it. Practically no-one does this.

About recording people secretly, the system provides automatic beeping to signal recording is in progress. There is also an automatic announcement that a user can switch off if they prefer to tell the counter party themselves. These are customisable which reflects that requirements change from country to country and state to state.

Calltrunk co-founder Angela Clarke said federal law only requires single-party consent for recorded calls, though some states require all-party consent. Representatives from Calltrunk and Uppidy said they leave it up to users to notify people if they are being recorded.

The law differs considerably from country to country. In the UK, Canada, and some states in the US, this so-called 'one party consent' is adequate (but businesses in the UK must tell people that calls are being recorded). In 15 states of the US, however, all parties involved need to have consented. This is also the case in Australia.

== Acquisition ==
Calltrunk was acquired by Bettervoice in May 2015. BetterVoice integrates with your address book just as Calltrunk did. Their outbound calling system uses your phone's outbound line, which is a more natural experience than Calltrunk's dial-back according to the letter sent to all CallTrunk users prior to the acquisition. On 8 May 2015 Calltrunk was completely shut down.
