= CereProc =

Speech synthesis company

- Developers: CereProc Ltd., UK
- Initial release: 2005; 21 years ago
- Stable release: July 2013; 12 years ago
- Written in: C/Python
- Operating system: Cross-platform
- Available in: English, German, French, Spanish, Italian, Dutch, Catalan, Romanian, Japanese, Portuguese, Scottish Gaelic, Swedish, Polish, Irish, Danish, Norwegian, Mandarin, Russian, Lithuanian, Welsh
- Type: Text-to-speech
- Licence: Commercial
- Website: www.cereproc.com

CereProc (/ˈsɛrəˌprɒk/ SERR-ə-prok) is a speech synthesis company based in Edinburgh, Scotland, founded in 2005. The company specialises in creating natural and expressive-sounding text to speech voices, synthesis voices with regional accents, and in voice cloning.

== Voice building technology ==
CereProc creates voices using two different voice-building technologies: unit selection synthesis and parametric modelling.

CereProc's unit selection voices are built from large databases of recorded speech. During database creation, each recorded utterance is segmented into some or all of the following: individual phones, syllables, morphemes, words, phrases, and sentences. The division into segments is done using a specially modified speech recogniser. An index of the units in the speech database is then created based on the segmentation and acoustic parameters like the fundamental frequency (pitch), duration, position in the syllable, and neighbouring phones. At runtime, the desired target utterance is created by determining the best chain of candidate units from the database (unit selection). Unit selection provides the greatest naturalness, because it applies digital signal processing (DSP) to the recorded speech only at concatenation points. DSP often makes recorded speech sound less natural.

CereProc's parametric voices produce speech synthesis based on statistical modelling methodologies. In this system, the frequency spectrum (vocal tract), fundamental frequency (vocal source), and duration (prosody) of speech are modelled simultaneously. Speech waveforms are generated from these parameters using a vocoder. Critically, these voices can be built from significantly less recorded speech than unit selection voices and have a much smaller footprint when installed, because of this they are used for private voice cloning.

== Voices and languages ==
CereProc has 81 generally-available voices that speak 24 languages in a number of different regional accents:

- American English: Isabella, Katherine, Hannah, Megan, Adam, Nathan, Andy (child voice), Jordan (child voice), Carolyn, Sam (gender neutral voice)
- Southern English: Sarah, William, Jack, Lauren, Giles, Amy, Lily (child voice), Ben (child voice)
- Northern English: Jess
- Scottish English: Heather, Kirsty, Stuart, Andrew (child voice), Mairi (child voice)
- Glasgow English: Dodo
- Lancashire English: Claire
- Irish English: Caitlin
- Welsh English: Seren (child voice), Catrin (child voice), Gethin (child voice), Owain (child voice), Rhodri (teenage voice), Tomos (teenage voice), Ffion (teenage voice), Rhian (teenage voice)
- West Midlands English: Sue
- Special FX voices: Demon, Ghost, Goblin, Pixie, Robot
- Metropolitan French: Suzanne, Laurent
- Canadian French: Florence
- Catalan: Rita
- Castilian Spanish: Sara
- Mexican Spanish: Ana
- Italian: Laura, Dario, Francesco (child voice), Nicoletta (child voice)
- Irish: Peig
- Dutch: Ada
- Standard German: Gudrun, Alex
- Austrian German: Leopold
- European Portuguese: Lúcia
- Brazilian Portuguese: Gabriel
- Japanese: Yuki
- Scottish Gaelic: Ceitidh
- Swedish: Ylva, Anders
- Polish: Pola
- Romanian: Daria
- French-accented English: Nicole
- Russian: Avrora
- Mandarin: Mailin
- Danish: Marie, Lars
- Norwegian (Bokmål): Clara, Magnus
- Norwegian (Nynorsk): Hulda
- Lithuanian: Mantas, Egle
- Welsh: Seren (child voice), Catrin (child voice), Gethin (child voice), Owain (child voice), Rhodri (teenage voice), Tomos (teenage voice), Ffion (teenage voice), Rhian (teenage voice)

In addition, the company has developed a number of celebrity voices that are not generally available to the public. These include George W. Bush, Barack Obama and Arnold Schwarzenegger.

== Voice cloning ==
In 2009, film critic Roger Ebert employed CereProc to create a synthetic version of his voice. Ebert had lost the power of speech following surgery to treat thyroid cancer. CereProc mined tapes and DVD commentaries featuring Ebert's voice to create a text-to-speech voice that sounded more like his own. Roger Ebert used the voice in his March 2, 2010, appearance on The Oprah Winfrey Show.

NFL player Steve Gleason had his voice cloned by CereProc following his diagnosis with MND. Gleason appeared in Microsoft's Super Bowl XLVIII commercial praising the power of technology, using his synthetic voice to narrate.

CereProc voice cloning technology is currently being used in the UK by people with MND, to create synthesis voices before they lose the power of speech. This process was featured in a BBC Radio 4 documentary, Giving the Critic Back His Voice, broadcast in August 2011.

== System compatibility ==
CereProc voices can be deployed on different operating systems and on different types of devices. CereProc desktop voices are compatible with Microsoft Windows and Apple Mac OS X. They install as system voices and are able to be used by other speech-enabled applications. CereProc's client/server system cServer, aimed principally at the corporate IVR market, can be run on Windows and Linux. CereProc Mobile voices can be deployed on Android and Apple iOS. The SDK is available for Android, Linux, MacOS, iOS, and Windows. The SDK has bindings for C/C++, C#, Java, and Python.

== See also ==
- Language
- Natural language processing
- Speech processing
- List of screen readers
