= NeoSpeech =

NeoSpeech Inc. was an American company that specialised in text-to-speech (TTS) software for embedded devices, mobile, desktop, and network/server applications. NeoSpeech was founded by two speech engineers, Lin Chase and Yoon Kim, in Fremont, California, US, in 2002. NeoSpeech was privately held, headquartered in Santa Clara, California.

Stephen Hawking was briefly a NeoSpeech TTS user in 2004, but soon returned to using his iconic DECtalk voice synthesizer since he identified with it so strongly. Adobe Systems has selected NeoSpeech speech synthesis for their e-learning authoring suite Adobe Captivate.

== History ==
NeoSpeech was a subsidiary of Korean company named Voiceware Co., Ltd. Voiceware was established in 2000. In January 2001 Voiceware released VoiceEz natural speech recognition technology, and VoiceCop speaker verification technology. In September 2001 Voiceware released VoiceText its first American English voice, named Kate, in VoiceText English.

In February 2002 Voiceware announced the establishment of US subsidiary, NeoSpeech, Inc.

in January 2006, a Japanese photographic company named Pentax acquired Voiceware Co., a producer of text-to-speech software technologies.

In 2007–2008, Pentax was acquired by HOYA Corporation.

Following the acquisition of ReadSpeaker (another text-to-speech company, the creator of rSpeak software) by HOYA in 2017, HOYA gathered all of its voice technology companies under the ReadSpeaker brand, encompassing the existing companies and brands of ReadSpeaker, rSpeak, Voiceware, VoiceText, and NeoSpeech.

== Products ==
VoiceText speech synthesis is the NeoSpeech software component that generates synthesized speech from input text. NeoSpeech uses Unit Selection Synthesis (USS), which utilises large databases of recorded sound segments to create synthesized speech. The VoiceText TTS Engine is mainly used to build custom stand-alone TTS applications such as AAC (Augmentative and alternative communication) products, gaming software, automated loud speaker/paging systems, educational software, and language learning apps. It also can be used simply to output a voice from an input text using a provided desktop TTS program.

== Languages ==
Languages include US and UK variants of English, Mexican Spanish, Canadian French, Chinese, Korean, and Japanese, with a variety of male and female voices.

The software is available for

- Desktop: Microsoft Windows, Unix/Linux/Solaris
- Mobile: iOS, Android, Windows CE
- Other: TRON Project, QNX, Nucleus RTOS

== See also ==
- Natural language processing
- Speech processing
- List of screen readers
- Comparison of speech synthesizers
- Voicetext markup language
