= Telephone call recording laws =

Legislations regarding telephone calls

Call recording laws for personal conversations by country One-party consent Depending on the type of call Two-party consent Note: Some one-party consent places may still place restrictions on public dissemination of recorded calls

Telephone call recording laws are legislation enacted in many jurisdictions, such as countries, states, provinces, that regulate the practice of telephone call recording. Call recording or monitoring is permitted or restricted with various levels of privacy protection, law enforcement requirements, anti-fraud measures, or individual party consent.

== Australia ==
The federal Telecommunications (Interception and Access) Act 1979 and State and Territory listening devices laws may both apply to monitoring or recording of telephone conversations. The general rule is that the call may not be recorded. Section 7 of the Telecommunications (Interception and Access) Act 1979 prohibits intercepting a telephone call. "Interception" is defined in section 6, of which one element is that it is made "without the knowledge of the person making the communication". There are exceptions to these rules in very limited circumstances, including where a warrant applies.

If a call is to be recorded or monitored, an organization must tell the other party at the beginning of the conversation so that it has the chance either to end the call, or to ask to be transferred to another line where monitoring or recording does not take place.

Reasons organizations may monitor or record conversations may include:

- to protect a person's intent in dealings with the organization
- to provide a record in the event of a dispute about a transaction
- to improve customer service.

In the state of Queensland it is not illegal to record a telephone conversation by a party to the conversation.

== Canada ==
=== Organizations ===
In Canada, organizations subject to the Personal Information Protection and Electronic Documents Act (PIPEDA) must comply with PIPEDA when recording calls.

In order to comply with the PIPEDA, organizations should take the following steps when recording conversations:

1. The individual must be informed that the conversation is being recorded at the beginning of the call. This can be done by an automated recording or by the customer service representative.
2. The individual must be advised of the purposes. The organization must be clear about the purposes; an organization should not state that it is recording the conversation for quality assurance purposes if, in fact, the recording will be used for other purposes. Informing the individual of the purposes can be done in a variety of ways—verbally, by pressing a number on the keypad (in the case of automated messages) or with clear messages on monthly statements. (For example: If you have any questions about your bill please call 1-800-XXX-XXXX. Please note your call will be recorded for...) If the individual proceeds knowing the conversation is being recorded and the purpose of the recording, consent is implied.
3. If the caller objects to the recording, the organization should provide the caller with meaningful alternatives. The alternatives might involve not taping the call; visiting a retail outlet; writing a letter; or, conducting the transaction over the Internet.

=== Individuals ===
An individual may record a call as long as they are one of the participants of the call. The recording can be used as evidence in a lawsuit.

However, it is illegal to record communications that the recording party is not participating in. An illegal recording can lead to a sentence of up to five years in prison. Section 183 (Part VI) of the Criminal Code also outlaws surreptitious recording of communications without consent of one of the intended recipients.

== Czech Republic ==
Calls and conversations may be recorded by any active participant, with no requirement to make other parties aware of the recording. It is quite restricted how can you use such recording. The main idea is to use it only for protection of your own rights guaranteed by the law. The law dealing with this is NOZ, § 86 and § 88 .

== Denmark ==
Calls and conversations may be recorded by any active participant, with no requirement to make other parties aware of the recording. But forwarding or playing calls considered private is illegal. The Denmark Data Protection Authority (DPA) ruled on 11 April 2019, that affirmative consent is required when companies record customer telephone calls.

== Finland ==
In the case of private persons, calls and conversations may be recorded by any active participant. There is no requirement to make other parties aware of the recording, but the use of recordings, depending on their content, may be subject to various laws, such as data protection (privacy) legislation, libel laws, laws governing trade and national secrets, and any agreements, such as non-disclosure agreements.

Recording of calls by a company or an employer is subject to data protection legislation and, as a general rule, requires informing the participants prior to recording.

== Germany ==
Germany is a two-party consent jurisdiction: telephone recording without the consent of the two or, when applicable, more, parties is a criminal offence according to § 201 of the German Criminal Code—violation of the confidentiality of the spoken word. Telephone tapping by authorities has to be approved by a judge. Telephone recording by a private citizen can be allowed in cases of self-defence, § 32 of the German Criminal Code, or Necessity, § 34 of the German Criminal Code. For discussion on lawful interception in Germany please see de:Telekommunikationsüberwachung (German language).

== India ==
India does not have a specific law which addresses the recording of phone calls.It is not criminal for a person to record a phone call in which they are themselves a participant without consent from the other parties although the recorders may be liable to legal action if the other party considers the action to be a breach of their privacy. However, the recording of phone calls in which the recorders are not themselves participating is illegal and prohibited by Article 21 of the Indian Constitution unless the person recording has prior consent from the participants of the call.

The Central Government or State Government is empowered to order interception of messages per 12, section 5 of Indian Telegraph Act 1885. Rule 419 and 419A sets out.

Telephone tapping is permitted based on court order only and such permission is granted only if it is required to prevent a major offense involving national security or to gather intelligence on anti-national or terrorist activities.

Though economic offenses/tax evasion were initially covered under the reasons for interception of phones, the same was withdrawn in 1999 by the Government based on a Supreme Court order citing protection to privacy of the individual.

As per Rule 428 of the India telegraphic rules, no person without the sanction of the telegraph authority, use any telephone or cause or suffer it to be used, purposes other than the establishment of local or trunk calls.

The Government of India instructions provide for approved attachments. There is no provision for attachment for recording conversation.

== Italy ==
According to the Supreme Court of Cassation, recorded conversations are legal and can be used as evidence in court, even if the other party is unaware of being recorded, provided that the recording party takes part of the conversation.

== Ireland ==
Recording calls is legal and recordings can be used as evidence in court, providing the person recording is a participant to the conversation, or has consent from at least one participant from the conversation.

== Latvia ==
Calls and conversations by private persons may be recorded by any active participant. There is no requirement in laws to make other parties aware of the recording, but the use of recordings, depending on their content, may be subject to various laws.

== Netherlands ==
Article 139a of Dutch Criminal law states that "He who deliberately uses a technical aid to record a conversation that is being held in a house, a closed room or a courtyard, without being a participant in the conversation and without any instructions from such a participant, is punishable with imprisonment of not more than six months or a fine of the fourth category". In other words, as long as one is themselves a participant, they are allowed to (discreetly) record the entirety of the conversation. Furthermore, while not explicitly stated, the European General Data Protection Regulation applies to any processing of private conversations that is not ’strictly personal’. Any publication, without explicit consent, is therefore forbidden.

== New Zealand ==
Recording of phone calls by private persons falls under interception-related provisions of the Crimes Act 1961, which has a general prohibition on the use of interception devices. An exception is made for when the person intercepting the call is a party to the conversation. There is no requirement that both parties be aware of the interception.

The recording of telephone calls however do fall under the purview of Privacy Act. In general, recording of telephone calls related to personal affairs does not contravene Privacy Act, whereas recording for any other purposes would. In particular, it is usually considered unfair to record someone without telling them. It can still be legal to record without consent if public interest in the content of the recording is strong enough to outweigh the privacy interest or confidentiality interest.

== Philippines ==
Under the Anti-Wiretapping Act (Republic Act 4200) (Note: Sometimes referred to as the Anti-Wiretapping Law, with the full title of An act to prohibit and penalize wire tapping and other related violations of the privacy of communication, and for other purposes.), it is unlawful to record or otherwise intercept any communication, including publishing any transcriptions of said communication, without the consent of all of the parties in such communication. This notably includes any party who is in the communication, or the recording of private communications otherwise done in a public place. The sole exception given are for crimes relating to national security, mutiny, and kidnapping, which requires a court order and is only granted if all other options are exhausted.

The act was mainly enacted to stop the then-prevalent practice of government officials secretly recording each other, with the senate author Sen. Lorenzo Tañada explaining in 1962 that the practice was the "most obnoxious instrument of oppression or arbitrary power".

Since the passage of law in 1965, multiple attempts to expand the exclusions has been attempted. In 2018, an attempt to expand the exclusions to coup d'état, robbery, drugs, illegal trafficking, and money laundering was passed at the committee level of the House of Representatives. In 2025, a similar amendment was filed in the Senate by Sen. Panfilo Lacson.

== Poland ==
According to the Polish Penal Code (art. 267), call recording is legal for a private person only when recording person is one of the participants. No consent from the other side is needed then. Similarly to Latvia, the use of recordings, depending on their content, may be subject to various laws.

== Romania ==
Intercepting communications falls under the provisions of the Penal Code and, in the case of electronic communications, under the Telecommunications Act (506/2004). The recording of a conversation by a private member to that conversation is specifically permitted. Nevertheless, while such recordings are legal, making use of them may fall subject to further civil or criminal law. Their admissibility as evidence also depends on the circumstances.

== South Korea ==
In South Korea, any party in communication in a phone call may record the call without prior consent or notice. This has been dubbed "one-party consent". Recordings made without notice have been the subject of a number of political scandals in the country. Whether to require consent or notice has been the subject of debate. Proponents for requiring consent have argued that recordings can be manipulated or misused for acts like blackmail, while opponents have argued that recordings have often been used as evidence by employees to prove workplace abuse, which can otherwise be difficult to obtain. In 2022, a bill was proposed by the ruling People Power Party to require consent or notice for recordings. A poll of 503 respondents conducted by Realmeter found that 64.1% of adult respondents were against requiring consent or notice.

== Sweden ==
According to the Swedish Penal Code (Brottsbalken) Chapter 4, 8–9 §§, it is illegal to make unauthorized recordings of telephone conversations. A court can grant permission for law enforcement agencies to tap telephone lines. Also, anyone participating in the telephone call may record the conversation — at least one party in the call must be aware of the recording being made. A recording is always admissible as evidence in a court, even if obtained in an illegal manner.

== Taiwan ==
According to Article 29 of The Communication Security and Surveillance Act of 1999, call recording is legal if the person conducting the surveillance is one of the parties in communication, or has obtained consent from one of the parties in communication, and the conduct is not for illegal purpose.

== Turkey ==
In Turkey, there are strict conditions for both the act of surveillance and the storage of the data obtained, but as long as it is clear what it is being used for and legal procedures were followed by authorities, it is permissible.

== United Kingdom ==
=== England and Wales ===
The Regulation of Investigatory Powers Act 2000 in general prohibits interception of communications by a third party, with exceptions related to government agencies. A recording made by one party to a phone call or e-mail without notifying the other is not prohibited provided that the recording is for their own use; acts which "make some or all of the contents of the communication available ... to a person other than the sender or intended recipient of the communication" are prohibited. Consent to disclose a call can be made retrospectively or argued to be in the public interest. Private recordings (not restricted to telephone recordings) can be used in court proceedings if the court gives permission.

Businesses may record with the knowledge of their employees but without notifying the other party for any of the following purposes:

- provide evidence of a business transaction
- ensure that a business complies with regulatory procedures
- see that quality standards or targets are being met
- protect national security
- prevent or detect crime
- investigate the unauthorised use of a telecommunications system
- secure the effective operation of the telecommunications system

Businesses may monitor without recording phone calls or e-mails that have been received to see whether they are relevant to the business (e.g., to check for business communications addressed to an employee who is away); but such monitoring must be proportional and in accordance with data protection laws and codes of practice.

There are special regulations governing recording for some types of organisation, such as in financial services or healthcare.

This summary does not necessarily cover all possible cases. There is a list of applicable laws on the Ofcom website:

- Regulation of Investigatory Powers Act 2000 ("RIPA")
- Telecommunications (Lawful Business Practice)(Interception of Communications) Regulations 2000 ("LBP Regulations")
- General Data Protection Regulation
- Telecommunications (Data Protection and Privacy) Regulations 1999
- Human Rights Act 1998

Under RIPA unlawful recording or monitoring of communications is a tort, allowing civil action in the courts.

Recording is sometimes officially advised, as in recording business transactions carried out by telephone to provide a record. It is sometimes mandatory; from March 2009 Financial Services Authority rules required firms to record all telephone conversations and electronic communications relating to client orders and the conclusion of transactions in the equity, bond, and derivatives markets. In November 2011 this was extended to cover the recording of mobile phone conversations that related to client orders and transactions by regulated firms.

=== Scotland ===
The situation in Scotland is similar to that in England and Wales, covered by the Regulation of Investigatory Powers (Scotland) Act 2000.

== United States ==
Laws in the United States vary by state. Call recording laws in some U.S. states require only one party to be aware of the recording, while other states generally require both parties to be aware. Several states require that all parties consent when one party wants to record a telephone conversation.

=== Two-party consent states ===
States that generally require that all parties consent to the recording include:

- California
- Connecticut (For electronic recordings only, all parties must be made aware of recordings, with few exceptions. For in-person recordings, the rule is always one party consent.)
- Florida
- Hawaii* (in general a one-party state, but requires two-party consent if the recording device is installed in a private place)
- Illinois (listening to, transmitting, or recording non-electronic private conversations require consent by all parties)
- Maryland
- Massachusetts (only "secret" recordings are banned, but is the only state without a "public location" exception. Despite having a 1968 law imposing general bans on taping wire and oral communications, it was later ruled to violate the First Amendment in the conditions espoused in a case filed by Project Veritas in 2018.)
- Montana (requires notification only)
- New Hampshire
- Oregon* (One party for electronic communications, two party for in-person conversations. Law was ruled in 2023 to violate the First Amendment in a case filed by Project Veritas, but this was overturned on appeal, leaving the Oregon law in place.)
- Pennsylvania
- Washington (however, section three of the Washington law states that permission is given if any of the parties announces that they will be recording the call in a reasonable manner if the recording contains that announcement).

=== One-party consent states ===
One-party consent states are:

- Alabama
- Alaska
- Arizona
- Arkansas
- Colorado
- Connecticut (for in-person conversations or phone calls recorded by a participant of the conversation)
- District of Columbia
- Georgia
- Hawaii
- Idaho
- Illinois (one-party only for parties to electronic conversations or to record law enforcement officers in public)
- Indiana
- Iowa
- Kansas
- Kentucky
- Louisiana
- Maine
- Michigan* (one-party only if the recording party is a participant in the conversation)
- Minnesota
- Mississippi
- Missouri
- Nebraska
- Nevada
- New Jersey
- New Mexico
- New York
- North Carolina
- North Dakota
- Ohio
- Oklahoma
- Oregon* (one-party for electronic communications, two-party for in-person conversations)
- Rhode Island (although consent is not required when the recorded party does not have a reason to expect privacy)
- South Carolina
- South Dakota (one-party only if the recording party is a participant in the conversation, or has consent of one participant in the conversation)(S.D. Codified Laws § 23A-35A-20 (2012))
- Tennessee
- Texas
- Utah
- Vermont
- Virginia (two-party consent required to be used in court for civil proceedings, but not criminal cases)
- West Virginia
- Wisconsin (two-party consent required to be used in court)
- Wyoming

Some states distinguish between electronic and in-person communication. For example, Illinois and Oregon are one-party consent states for electronic communication but require all-party consent for live, in-person communication, with a few exceptions.

The California Supreme Court ruled in 2006 that if a caller in a one-party state records a conversation with someone in California, that one-party state caller is subject to the Californian requirement of consent from all callers (cf. Kearney v. Salomon Smith Barney Inc., 39 Cal. 4th 95). However, non-disclosure recordings by one of the parties can legally be made if the other party is threatening kidnapping, extortion, bribery, human trafficking, or other felony violence. Also included in the exception is misdemeanor obscenity and threats of injury to persons or property via an electronic communication device (usually a telephone) if directed in whole or in part towards a conversation participant or family members.

Following the Illinois Supreme Court's decision in People v. Clark/Melongo on 20 March 2014, which struck down Illinois' two-party consent law, Illinois was a one-party consent state. However, the state legislature amended the statute and, as of 30 December 2014, Illinois is once again a two-party consent state for non-electronic communications.

The Michigan Court of Appeals ruled in 1982 that participants in a conversation may record a discussion without getting the permission of other participants. The ruling stated that eavesdropping only applies to "a third party not otherwise involved in the conversation being eavesdropped on". This is because the law uses the wording, "the private discourse of others", rather than the wording, "the private discourse of others or with others". Michigan law is often misinterpreted as requiring the consent of all parties to a conversation. In 2019, a US District Court acknowledged the 1982 Michigan Court of Appeals Case, but predicted the Michigan Supreme Court would decide that participants in a conversation may not record a discussion without the consent of all parties; accordingly, it ruled that Michigan required consent of all parties, creating a split among different courts. However, in 2021, the US District Court reversed itself by reconsideration, in part due to a request made by the Michigan Attorney General, and resolved the split among the courts by changing its ruling such that Michigan allows a party in a conversation to record a discussion without getting the permission of other participants.

=== Accepted forms of notification recording by a telephone company ===
The Federal Communications Commission defines accepted forms of notification for telephone recording by telephone companies as:

- prior verbal (oral) or written notification of all parties to the telephone conversation;
- verbal (oral) notification before the recording is made (this is the most commonly used type);
- an audible beep tone repeated at regular intervals during the call.

=== SCOTUS ===
In Rathbun v. United States, the U.S. Supreme Court ruled in regard to interstate or foreign communication that "the clear inference is that one entitled to receive the communication may use it for his own benefit or have another use it for him. The communication itself is not privileged, and one party may not force the other to secrecy merely by using a telephone. It has been conceded by those who believe the conduct here violates Section 605 [of the Federal Communication Act] that either party may record the conversation and publish it." See United States v. Polakoff, 113 F. 2d 888, 889.

=== Copyright ===
Recordings of telephone calls may be protected as sound recordings under federal copyright law. Under 17 U.S.C. § 101, "a work consisting of sounds, images, or both, that are being transmitted" can be copyrighted as long as "a fixation of the work is being made simultaneously with its transmission." Thus, if a phone call is being recorded "by or under the authority of the author", a wiretapper would infringe the copyright in the audio transmission even if they recorded it directly rather than accessing the copyright owner's recording of it.

In Swatch Group Management Services Ltd. v. Bloomberg L.P. (2014), the Swatch Group sued Bloomberg for obtaining a recording of an earnings call without authorization and disseminating it to paid subscribers. Swatch asserted a copyright in the recording of its senior executives' comments (as a work for hire) but not in the questions posed by the outside analysts on the call. However, the Court of Appeals for the Second Circuit found that Bloomberg's dissemination of the recording was fair use.

== See also ==
- Covert listening device
- Eavesdropping
- Phone hacking
- Secure telephone
- Telephone tapping
