= BroadSoft =

Communication software and service provider acquired by Cisco Systems

BroadSoft Inc.
- Type: Subsidiary
- Traded as: Nasdaq: BSFT
- Industry: Communication software
- Founded: 1998; 28 years ago
- Headquarters: Gaithersburg, Maryland, United States
- Key people: Michael Tessler (president & CEO); James A. Tholen (CFO)
- Revenue: ▲US$ 340.96 million (2016)
- Operating income: ▲US$ 15.51 million (2016)
- Net income: ▲US$ 0.82 million (2016)
- Total assets: ▲US$ 651.20 million (2016)
- Total equity: ▲US$ 301.23 million (2016)
- Number of employees: 1,597 (2016)
- Parent: Cisco Systems
- Website: cisco.com

BroadSoft, Inc. is a communication software and service provider that was acquired by Cisco Systems in 2018. BroadSoft was founded in 1998 and completed its initial public offering in 2010, and was headquartered in Maryland. It partners with carriers and large service providers in several countries. BroadSoft’s customers include AT&T, Verizon Communications, Sprint, Charter Communications, Comcast, KPN and Vodafone. The company provides technology for service providers to build cloud-based communications services such as voice, video, web conferencing and team messaging and contextual services.

== History ==
The company was founded by Michael Tessler and Scott D. Hoffpauir in 1998. Prior to Broadsoft, Tessler worked at several telecommunications manufacturers and later joined Celcore, a wireless startup. Following the acquisition of Celcore by Alcatel, Tessler and Hoffpauir, an executive at Alcatel, decided to branch out on their own and create BroadSoft. BroadSoft then received $5 million in Series A round funding.

BroadSoft grew organically and through acquisitions over 20 years.

• 1998 – Company officially started with the name iKnow

• 1999 – Renamed to BroadSoft

• August 2000 – Montreal research and development center opened

• 2003 – Fujitsu becomes the principal system integration partner for BroadSoft in the Asia-Pacific

• September 2005 – Acquired Carbon Twelve

• November 2006 – Opened new offices in Belfast, Northern Ireland

• August 2008 – Acquired Genband's M6 communication applications server, formerly VocalData

• December 2008 – Acquired Sylantro Systems

• October 2009 – Acquired Packet Island

• June 2010 – BroadSoft debuted on the Nasdaq Global Market

• October 2010 – Acquired Casabi

• October 2011 – Acquired iLinc Communications and Movial Applications Oy

• April 2012 – Acquired Partners 1993 EOOD

• August 2012 – Acquired Adaption Technologies Ventures

• August 2013 – Acquired Hosted IP Communications (Europe) Limited (HIPCOM)

• December 2013 – Acquired finocom AG

• August 2014 – Acquired Systems Design & Development, Inc. (SDD)

• January 2015 – Acquired Leonid Systems

• June 2015 – Acquired mPortal

• November 2015 – Acquired PBXL

• February 2016 – Acquired Transera

• May 2016 – Acquired Intellinote

• October 2016 – Acquired VoIP Logic

• November 2016 – Launches Team-One

• October 2017 - BroadSoft announced that it had entered into an agreement to be acquired by Cisco for approximately $2 billion.

• February 2018 - BroadSoft acquired by Cisco
