= Festival Speech Synthesis System =

Free software

Festival
- Developer: Centre for Speech Technology Research (CSTR) of the University of Edinburgh
- Stable release: 2.5 / December 2017; 8 years ago
- Written in: C++
- Operating system: Cross-platform
- Type: Speech synthesizer
- License: Similar to MIT License (Free software)
- Website: www.cstr.ed.ac.uk/projects/festival/

The Festival Speech Synthesis System is a general multi-lingual speech synthesis system originally developed by Alan W. Black, Paul Taylor and Richard Caley at the Centre for Speech Technology Research (CSTR) at the University of Edinburgh. Substantial contributions have also been provided by Carnegie Mellon University and other sites. It is distributed under a free software license similar to the BSD License.

It offers a full text to speech system with various APIs, as well as an environment for development and research of speech synthesis techniques. It is written in C++ with a Scheme-like command interpreter for general customization and extension.

Festival is designed to support multiple languages, and comes with support for English (British and American pronunciation), Welsh, and Spanish. Voice packages exist for several other languages, such as Castilian Spanish, Czech, Finnish, Hindi, Italian, Marathi, Polish, Russian and Telugu.

== Festvox ==
The Festvox project aims to make the building of new synthetic voices more systematic and better documented, making it possible for anyone to build a new voice. It is distributed under a free software license similar to the MIT License.

Festvox is a suite of tools by Alan W. Black and Kevin Lenzo for building synthetic voices for Festival. It includes a step-by-step tutorial with examples in document called "Building Synthetic Voices".

== Flite ==
Flite is a small run-time speech synthesis engine developed at Carnegie Mellon University, derived from both Festival and Festvox.

== Linux compatibility ==
There is a Festival plug-in for GStreamer. Festival is pre-packaged for several Linux distributions.

== See also ==
- Orca (assistive technology)
