= Call blocking =

Telephone service to stop calls from specific numbers

Call blocking, also known as call block, call screening, or call rejection, allows a telephone subscriber to block incoming calls from specific telephone numbers. This feature may require an additional payment to the subscriber's telephone company or a third-party.

Call blocking is desired by individuals who wish to block unwanted phone calls. These generally include types of unsolicited calls from telemarketers and robocalls.

== Landlines ==
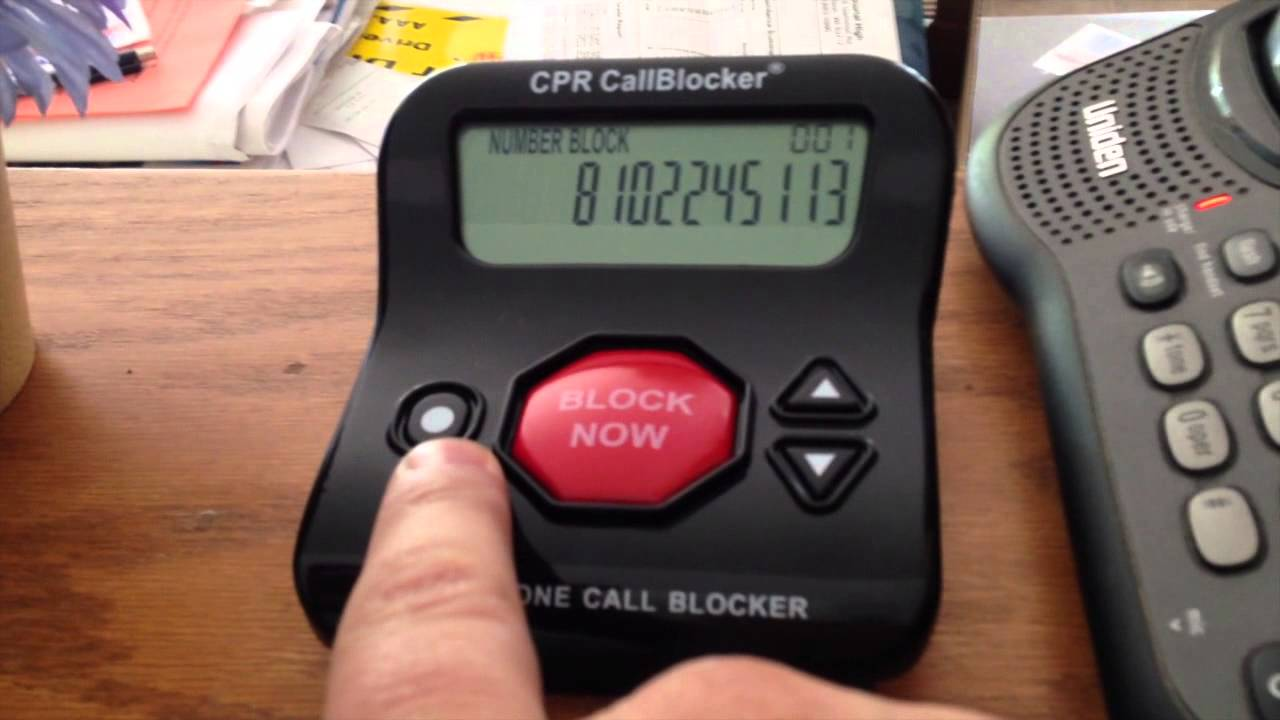
Landline call blocker in use

Unwanted calls to landlines may be blocked through a number of methods. Some landline phones have built-in call blocking facilities. External call blockers are sold as telephone accessories which plug into existing phones.

Call blockers and related services recently received attention in 2016 from publications including Which? in the United Kingdom and Consumer Reports in the United States. Such devices and services enable the user to block a call as it is in progress or alternatively block the number after the call is made. These devices rely on caller ID information, so that a phone blocker requires a caller ID service to be active.

Treatment of blocked calls may include:

- Sending the caller to voicemail
- Sending the caller to busy signal
- Sending the caller to "Number No Longer in Service"
- Sending the caller to "Keep Ringing"

== Smartphones ==
There are a multitude of third-party call blocking applications available for smartphones, in addition to the built-in call blocking functions furnished on most models.

== Effectiveness ==
Many phones permit users to automatically block all unfamiliar phone numbers, but this strategy runs the obvious risk of rejecting a legitimate call. Users often choose instead to vet numbers individually, manually blocking subsequent calls from numbers judged to be spam. This tends to be especially true given spammers' increasing use of so-called "neighbor spoofing", which chooses numbers similar to the user's and is thus designed to increase the probability of answering a call. Statistical analysis has analyzed the effectiveness of such manual call blocking.

== See also ==
- Caller ID spoofing
