= Embodied agent =

Artificial intelligence concept

In artificial intelligence, an embodied agent, also sometimes referred to as an interface agent, is an intelligent agent that interacts with the environment through a physical body within that environment. Agents that are represented graphically with a body, for example a human or a cartoon animal, are also called embodied agents, although they have only virtual, not physical, embodiment. A branch of artificial intelligence focuses on empowering such agents to interact autonomously with human beings and the environment. Mobile robots are one example of physically embodied agents; Ananova and Microsoft Agent are examples of graphically embodied agents. Embodied conversational agents are embodied agents (usually with a graphical front-end as opposed to a robotic body) that are capable of engaging in conversation with one another and with humans employing the same verbal and nonverbal means that humans do (such as gesture, facial expression, and so forth).

== Embodied conversational agents ==
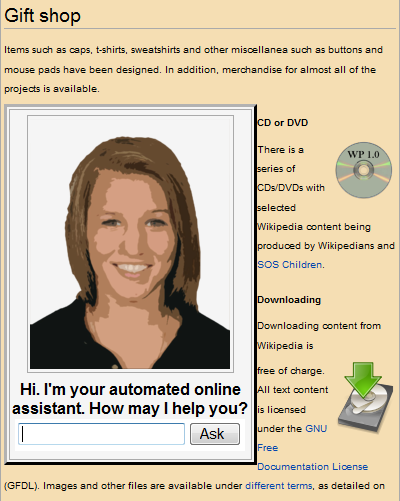
A 2011 image of an automated online assistant providing customer service on a web page – an example of an embodied conversational agent

Embodied conversational agents are a form of intelligent user interface. Graphically embodied agents aim to unite gesture, facial expression and speech to enable face-to-face communication with users, providing a powerful means of human-computer interaction.

== Advantages ==
Face-to-face communication allows communication protocols that give a much richer communication channel than other means of communicating. It enables pragmatic communication acts such as conversational turn-taking, facial expression of emotions, information structure and emphasis, visualization and iconic gestures, and orientation in a three-dimensional environment. This communication takes place through both verbal and non-verbal channels such as gaze, gesture, spoken intonation and body posture.

Research has found that users prefer a non-verbal visual indication of an embodied system's internal state to a verbal indication, demonstrating the value of additional non-verbal communication channels. As well as this, the face-to-face communication involved in interacting with an embodied agent can be conducted alongside another task without distracting the human participants, instead improving the enjoyment of such an interaction. Furthermore, the use of an embodied presentation agent results in improved recall of the presented information.

Embodied agents also provide a social dimension to the interaction. Humans willingly ascribe social awareness to computers, and thus interaction with embodied agents follows social conventions, similar to human to human interactions. This social interaction both raises the believably and perceived trustworthiness of agents, and increases the user's engagement with the system. Rickenberg and Reeves found that the presence of an embodied agent on a website increased the level of user trust in that website, but also increased users' anxiety and affected their performance, as if they were being watched by a real human. Another effect of the social aspect of agents is that presentations given by an embodied agent are perceived as being more entertaining and less difficult than similar presentations given without an agent. Research shows that perceived enjoyment, followed by perceived usefulness and ease of use, is the major factor influencing user adoption of embodied agents.

A study in January 2004 by Byron Reeves at Stanford demonstrated how digital characters could "enhance online experiences" through explaining how virtual characters essentially add a sense of familiarity to the user experience and make it more approachable. This increase in likability in turn helps make the products better, which benefits both the end users and those creating the product.

=== Applications ===
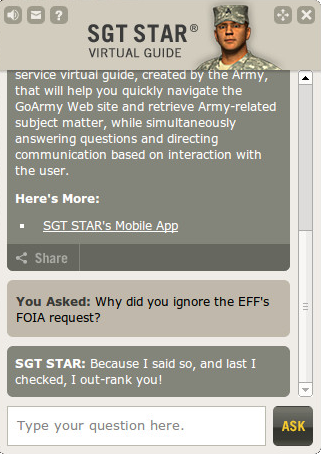
Sgt. Star, the U.S. Army's online assistant

The rich style of communication that characterizes human conversation makes conversational interaction with embodied conversational agents ideal for many non-traditional interaction tasks. A familiar application of graphically embodied agents is computer games; embodied agents are ideal for this setting because the richer communication style makes interacting with the agent enjoyable. Embodied conversational agents have also been used in virtual training environments, portable personal navigation guides, interactive fiction and storytelling systems, interactive online characters and automated presenters and commentators.

Major virtual assistants like Siri, Amazon Alexa and Google Assistant do not come with any visual embodied representation, which is believed to limit the sense of human presence by users.

The U.S. Department of Defense utilizes a software agent called SGT STAR on U.S. Army-run Web sites and Web applications for site navigation, recruitment and propaganda purposes. Sgt. Star is run by the Army Marketing and Research Group, a division operated directly from The Pentagon. Sgt. Star is based upon the ActiveSentry technology developed by Next IT, a Washington-based information technology services company. Other such bots in the Sgt. Star "family" are utilized by the Federal Bureau of Investigation and the Central Intelligence Agency for intelligence gathering purposes.

== See also ==
- Ambient intelligence
- Artificial conversational entity
- Autonomous agent
- Avatar (computing)
- Chatbot
- Institute for Creative Technologies
- Intelligent agent
- Internet Relay Chat bot
- Multi-agent system
- Player character
- Social bot
- Software agent
- Software bot
- Virtual assistant
- AI agent
