= Information Bridge Framework =

Information Bridge Framework is a Microsoft Office programmability framework from Microsoft targeting Microsoft Office 2003 and later versions. It can be used to extract data from Office documents or embedding functionality of Office applications in custom applications.
