= Speech Application Language Tags =

Speech Application Language Tags (SALT) is an XML-based markup language that is used in HTML and XHTML pages to add voice recognition capabilities to web-based applications.

== Description ==
Speech Application Language Tags enables multimodal and telephony-enabled access to information, applications, and Web services from PCs, telephones, tablet PCs, and wireless personal digital assistants (PDAs). The Speech Application Language Tags extend existing mark-up languages such as HTML, XHTML, and XML. Multimodal access will enable users to interact with an application in a variety of ways: they will be able to input data using speech, a keyboard, keypad, mouse and/or stylus, and produce data as synthesized speech, audio, plain text, motion video, and/or graphics.

== History ==
SALT was developed as a competitor to VoiceXML and was supported by the SALT Forum. The SALT Forum was founded on October 15, 2001, by Microsoft, along with Cisco Systems, Comverse, Intel, Philips Consumer Electronics, and ScanSoft. The SALT 1.0 specification was submitted to the W3C (World Wide Web Consortium) for review in August 2002. However, the W3C continued developing its VoiceXML 2.0 standard, which reached the final "Recommendation" stage in March 2004.

By 2006, Microsoft realized Speech Server had to support the W3C VoiceXML standard to remain competitive. Microsoft joined the VoiceXML Forum as a Promoter in April of that year. Speech Server 2007 supports VoiceXML 2.0 and 2.1 in addition to SALT. In 2007, Microsoft purchased Tellme, one of the largest VoiceXML service providers.

By that point nearly every other SALT Forum company had committed to VoiceXML. The last press release posted to the SALT Forum website was in 2003, while the VoiceXML Forum is quite active. "SALT [Speech Application Language Tags] is a direct competitor but has not reached the level of maturity of VoiceXML in the standards process," said Bill Meisel, principal at TMA Associates, a speech technology research firm.

== Usage ==
The Microsoft Speech Server 2004 product supports SALT, while Microsoft Speech Server 2007 supports SALT in addition to VoiceXML 2.0 and 2.1. There is also a speech add-in for Internet Explorer that interprets SALT tags on web pages, available as part of the Microsoft Speech Application SDK.
