= SASDK =

Microsoft's Speech Application SDK

The SASDK is Microsoft's Speech Application SDK. It is used to create telephony applications as well as multimodal web-based applications. It complies with the SALT XML standard, unlike Microsoft's earlier endeavors. The SASDK is used to create web-based applications only. It can be used to create a single application with both a web interface and a telephony interface.

It also includes a speech add-in for Internet Explorer that supports Speech Application Language Tags (SALT) 1.0.

== See also ==
- Speech Application Language Tagss (SALT)
- Microsoft SAPI
- Microsoft Speech Server
- VoiceXML (a competing W3C standard)
