= Tandy Trower =

American computer scientist

- Education: Washington State University
- Known for: Microsoft Flight Simulator; Microsoft BASIC; Microsoft Windows; Robotics

Tandy Trower is the current CEO of Hoaloha Robotics LLC, a robotics company based in Seattle, Washington, developing an autonomously mobile, socially interactive robot, to empower senior citizens to live more independently.

Mr. Trower previously worked at Microsoft for 28 years where he was involved with over two dozen products, many of them well known in the market. In his last role at Microsoft he was the General Manager of the Robotics Group and spoke extensively at conferences and universities about the future of robotics. After leaving Microsoft, he founded Hoaloha Robotics.

== Early career ==
After teaching himself to program, first on a Radio Shack TRS-80 Model 1 and later an Apple II, Tandy switched careers from working as an engineer in the semiconductor industry, and moved to developing software in 1979, when he was hired to work at the San Francisco office of Wicat, a company developing education and curriculum based products for schools. There he worked for Dr. Jim Schuyler on a classroom curriculum management package for the Apple II being developed for SRA. In 1980, he was hired by Atari in the personal computer division, which was the newest of the businesses at the time, and just after Atari's acquisition by Warner Communications from Nolan Bushnell.

Starting out by evaluating software product for possible acquisition, he quickly worked as a product manager for a variety of different educational and entertainment products for the Atari 400 and 800 computers, and recommended to executive management that Atari acquire a license for Microsoft BASIC, since at that time Atari's personal computers ran a BASIC created by Shepherdson Microsystems, and was not fully compatible with the BASICs that was featured on other early competitive PCs like the Apple II and Commodore PET. Bill Gates himself came down to the Atari office in Sunnyvale and negotiated the features in the spec.

== Transition to Microsoft ==
In late 1981, Tandy inquired about possible openings at Microsoft and was invited up to interview and was offered a position by Steve Ballmer, Microsoft's then acting HR manager, to join the company. At that time there were about 90 employees. He joined as part of a new product marketing team which included Jeff Raikes, Chris Larson, Carl Stork, Mark Deutsch, and Mark Ursino. (See the end of the video on Channel 9).

The team was assigned responsibility for marketing all of the various BASIC products which included an OEM version of BASIC that IBM was shipping with their new PC, known as GW-BASIC. It also included a variety of BASIC interpreters for 6800, 6809, 6502, Z-80, 8080, and 8086 processors as well as BASIC compilers. In addition, he was responsible for the few games (Microsoft Decathlon, Adventure); educational products (Typing Tutor); a couple of hardware products including the already shipping Z-80 based SoftCard and RAMCard for the Apple II computers; muMath (a symbolic equation processor); and muLisp (a LISP interpreter). His first manager at Microsoft was Nigel Smith.

Within 3 months, responsibility for marketing COBOL and Microsoft Sort 80, a file sorting utility, were also transferred to him. About 6 months later he was also given responsibility for marketing Microsoft Pascal, FORTRAN, MacroAssembler, and the responsibility for launching the first Microsoft C compiler for MS-DOS. At this time he shed responsibility for the hardware products, and the games and educational products, but not before managing the release of the very first version of Microsoft Flight Simulator which was created for Microsoft by Bruce Artwick.

During the following 3 years, he built a small marketing team around the programming languages family and extended the family to include the first BASIC Interpreter and Compiler for the Apple Macintosh.

== Windows ==
Late in 1984, Steve Ballmer, who had become Tandy's boss, asked him to take over retail marketing responsibility for Microsoft Windows. IBM had rejected licensing Windows in favor of their own character based windowed app manager called TopView, but Microsoft continued with the development of a graphical user interface. Windows 1.0 shipped in fall of 1985. That version of Windows bears a scant resemblance to today's version since it had to run on CGA cards which had a resolution of 640×200 pixels, and, prior to Tandy joining the team, it had been decided to use tiled windows rather than overlapping ones as it had in its original design.

Tandy wrote the specs for a set of desktop applets including a Paint program, a simple word processor called Windows Write, Calculator, Reversi game, Notepad, File Manager, and Calendar program. He also defined a way to change system parameters using an app called the Control Panel.

Applications for Windows were slow in coming to market at first. In July 1986 Tandy, as Director of Marketing for Windows, had to admit that there were less than a dozen third-party apps.

He stayed on to help manage Windows 2.0 and the interface shifted back to overlapping windows. It became the platform for one of the first significant applications to run on Windows, Microsoft Excel. By then a company called Aldus had also created a Windows version of their popular page layout product, Pagemaker, which took advantage of a printer driver for the HP LaserJet printer. At the time most printers were dot matrix.

By that time, there was a Joint Development Agreement with IBM (who still rejected licensing Windows) where Microsoft and IBM would work together on a new OS called OS/2 that would include its own window manager called Presentation Manager. The UIs for Windows and OS/2 Presentation Manager had to be kept in sync so users could move smoothly between them and Tandy became the liaison to negotiating features between the products in an effort to keep them operational compatible.

When Windows 2.0 shipped in November 1987, Tandy proposed the creation of a new group at Microsoft that would do usability testing, app interface design, publish UI guidelines, and create prototypes of new UIs. Subsequently, he founded Microsoft's first usability test labs and wrote most of the guidelines for designing Windows applications that were published by Microsoft Press. He was also a featured speaker on application interface design at early user interface conferences.

Around this time Apple sued Microsoft over Windows. Tandy was involved in depositions and tasked with creating videos and other educational elements for the Microsoft legal team to use in court. Eventually, the matter was settled out of court.

== Interactive Software Agents ==
As user interface design and usability assessment became more common practice and integrated into the product teams at Microsoft, Tandy shifted to primarily focus on promoting good design practice and new UI innovations. It was during this time that the ill-fated Microsoft Bob was being created within Microsoft Consumer Applications Division. Having met with team to evaluate the design work, Tandy felt the design approach had the right motivation and a good conceptual model based on the research of Stanford professors, Byron Reeves and Clifford Nass, which confirmed through a number of experiments that humans react to social stimuli, even when presented from non-human sources. However, he disagreed with the implementation that the Microsoft Bob team was developing. In response, Tandy hired a contract developer to create an interface for on-screen character agents, called Microsoft Agent which enabled any Windows developer to incorporate interactive characters into their application or Web pages. In addition to the code to support interaction, four characters that developers could license, including a robot (Robby), parrot (Peedy - borrowed from MSR Persona Project), wizard (Merlin), and genie (Genie), as well as a tool that enabled developers to create their own characters and animation sequences. In a paper presented at the ACM Conference on Human Factors in Computing Systems in 1997, Tandy discussed how to create conversational interfaces for interactive agents.

It was later used by the Office team to support the Office Assistant and replace the original Microsoft Bob code that had been used. However, the Office team created their own set of characters including the infamous Clippit (aka "Clippy"). Microsoft Agent was also included in the user registration component of Windows ME and featured in a number of Microsoft Research projects as well as third-party applications and websites. The code was later dropped out of both Windows and Office due to the unsatisfactory user acceptance of the technology and despite his efforts to improve the way the interface could be used, the project was discontinued at Microsoft.

== Windows Media Center and beyond ==
In 2004, Tandy transferred to Craig Mundie's organization where he was responsible for the user interface team for Windows Media Center which subsequently was shifted under Will Poole's Digital Media Division. After building the initial team and specifications, he recruited Joe Belfiore to replace him and moved back to work for Mundie, this time with the mission of coming up with an application scenario that could demonstrate the value of the concurrency work that Mundie was incubating under a project called BigTop. BigTop's objective was to fulfill Mundie's vision of helping developers with the need to shift development from single threaded single processor based development to asynchronous, distributed processing without the conventional complications of managing threads, locks, and semaphores to manage interaction between the simultaneously running code modules. This eventually became the CCR (Concurrency and Coordination Runtime) and DSS (Decentralized Software Services) that were later included in Microsoft Robotics Developer Studio and CCR & DSS Toolkit). However, in this first attempt to identify a compelling scenario, Tandy investigated bio-inspired technologies like neural networks, genetic algorithms, and swarm processing, but eventually proposing a project to build a dialogue software engine that would enable natural conversation. However, the project was canceled.

== Gates Strategic Staff and Research into Robotics ==
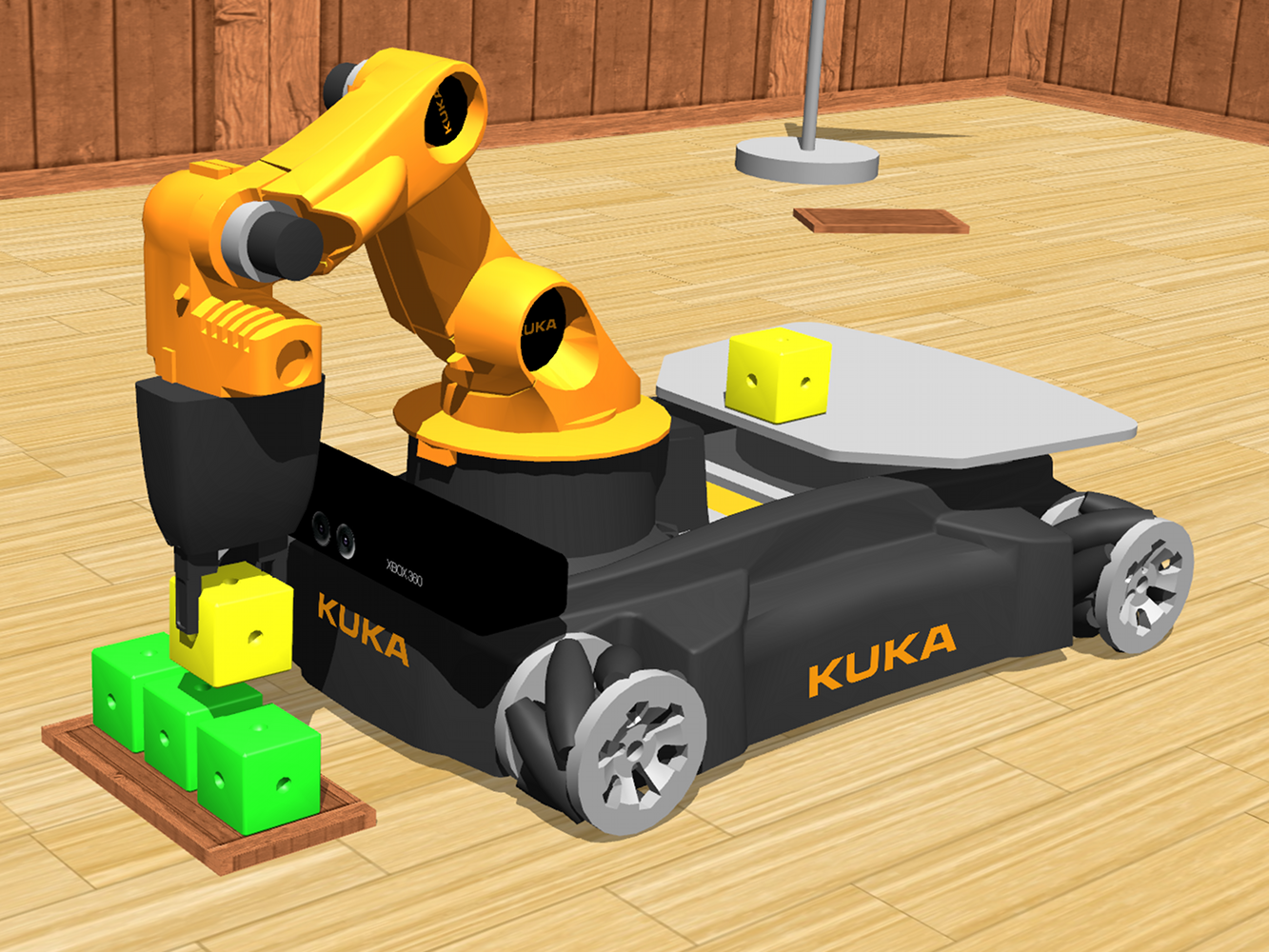
Simulation of a KUKA youBot mounted with a Microsoft Kinect device in Webots

In 2005, Tandy transferred to work as part of Bill Gates' strategic staff, with the role of helping Gates keep up with ongoing internal and external developments.

During this time Tandy was invited to meetings with different parts of the robotics community, including researchers in universities, vendors like ABB and KUKA in the industrial robotics sector, and a LEGO VP who was looking for software for their new robotics kits, etc. There appeared to be a common message despite coming from diverse parts of the technology world: robotics was on a new "disruptive" course and moving toward a new personal form.

After talking with a number of leaders in the robotics community and assessing the available resources, Tandy discussed robotics with Bill Gates. This led to a proposal to create a development kit that could provide a consistent platform and tools that could be applied to a wide variety of robots. Gates requested review and input from Craig Mundie and MSR Senior VP, Rick Rashid and the proposal was approved to move to a prototype phase and would be integrated the concurrency work that Mundie had been incubating. Nine months later, after a subsequent review, the project was approved for product development. with the first Community Technology Preview (CTP) shipped in June 2006 called Microsoft Robotics Studio. The official release of V1.0 was in December 2006.

The 2.0 release in November 2008 was renamed to Microsoft Robotics Developer Studio. After the 4.0 release in 2012, Microsoft discontinued the product and closed down the Robotics Group. Since then there has been some work on Robotics within Microsoft, including on ROS (Robot Operating System) for Windows, but Microsoft's involvement in Robotics has been minimal.

== Post Microsoft ==
Tandy Trower resigned from Microsoft in November 2009 to pursue a new venture to create software and services to support robotic solutions that can enhance the lives of an increasing worldwide population that require assistive care. The new venture named Hoaloha Robotics ("hoaloha" being the Hawaiian word for "friend") was launched in September 2010.
