= Prody Parrot =

Desktop assistant software created by Mindmaker

- Prody Parrot splash screen
- Developer: Mindmaker
- Initial release: 1999
- Final release: 2.0
- Platform: Windows 9x, Windows NT
- Type: Virtual assistant
- License: Freemium

Prody Parrot is a discontinued desktop assistant computer program made for the Windows 9x and Windows NT series of operating systems. It was created by Mindmaker in 1999, and acted to help computer users in business environments, whilst still having the facilities to engage and entertain users at home PCs.

== Behaviour ==
Prody, the software's titular parrot, will fly around the screen and offer help where necessary. When he isn't needed, he will either 'perch' on the user's taskbar or on the top of one of the user's windows. The user can engage with Prody through a variety of different methods. Prody was designed to incorporate business functions as well, such as searching the stock market. Bundled with the software is a version of Creative Labs' Dr. Sbaitso program, integrated into the Prody Parrot software.

== See also ==
- Talking Moose, the first desktop assistant program made for Apple Macintosh, which was of a similar nature to Prody
- Microsoft Office Assistant, a series of desktop assistants who were incorporated with the Microsoft Office series of programs, including the infamous paperclip Clippy
- Virtual pet
- BonziBuddy, a similar "desktop assistant" which was later found out to be adware, and claims of malware were made against it
