= CoolSpeech =

Text-to-speech program for Microsoft Windows

- Developer(s): ByteCool Software Inc
- Stable release: 5.0
- Operating system: Windows
- Available in: English
- Type: Text to speech
- License: Proprietary Shareware
- Website: www.verbatik.com

CoolSpeech is a proprietary text-to-speech program for Microsoft Windows platform, developed by ByteCool Software Inc, founded in February 2001. CoolSpeech controls text-to-speech engines compliant with Microsoft Speech API to fetch and read aloud text from a variety of sources, including websites, email accounts, local text documents (.txt, .rtf, .htm/html), the Windows Clipboard, keyboard input from anywhere in Windows, and the current date and time. It can also bookmark a text source to be read aloud periodically or on-demand.

== Features ==
- Listen to online news from any URL specified by the user.
- Read local text files, rich-text files and HTML files aloud.
- Convert a given piece of text into a spoken wave file (.wav).
- Listen to new messages from POP3 email accounts specified by the user.
- Listen to every word or sentence the user has just typed anywhere in Windows.
- Listen to text copied to the Windows Clipboard immediately.
- Schedule files, URLs and emails to be read aloud.
- Tell the current time and the date in different styles.
- Support all Microsoft Speech API 4.0-compliant voices.

== Awards ==
- ZDNet "Hot File of the Day" on January 6, 2004.
- MSN "Featured Download" on February 19, 2005.
- SmartComputing magazine's "November 2007 Smart Choice Award".

== Sister product ==
CoolSpeech has a sister product TextSound, which specializes in enhanced capabilities to batch convert text files into audio files, for users who need to produce spoken audio files in large volumes.

== See also ==
- Speech synthesis
- Microsoft Speech API
