= Microsoft Cordless Phone System =

The Microsoft Cordless Phone System (also known as PC Phone System MP-900) is a discontinued cordless telephone introduced by Microsoft in 1998 that featured personal computer integration. It was Microsoft's first telephone of any kind, and the only phone product made by the company until the Windows Mobile series of smartphones.

== Features ==
The MCPS consists of three main hardware components: a cordless handset, a base station, and a charging cradle. The MCPS could, like traditional cordless phones, make and receive telephone calls independently from a PC; however, the base station could also be connected to a computer via a serial port to provide additional functionality including enhanced caller ID features and PC voice message integration. Microsoft released a supplementary Call Manager application, compatible with the Windows 95 and Windows 98 operating systems, that allowed users to make and receive calls, and to listen to or delete voice messages, contacts, and call history. The software automatically logged the date, time, and duration of all incoming and outgoing calls on a connected PC.

MCPS also featured speech recognition and speech synthesis capabilities; for example, an owner could command the cordless handset to call a desired contact (e.g., by stating "Call John Smith"), and a caller ID feature would announce the name of an incoming caller (e.g., "Smith, John, calling"), with voice messages being stored on the recipient's computer. The system required that the computer remain turned on and the call manager active for this functionality.

The system was not compatible with Windows NT or Macintosh.

== See also ==
- Cortana
- Microsoft Exchange Server
- Microsoft Mobile
- Microsoft Outlook
- Nokia
- Skype
- Windows Phone
- Windows Speech Recognition
