= Xuedong Huang =

American computer scientist

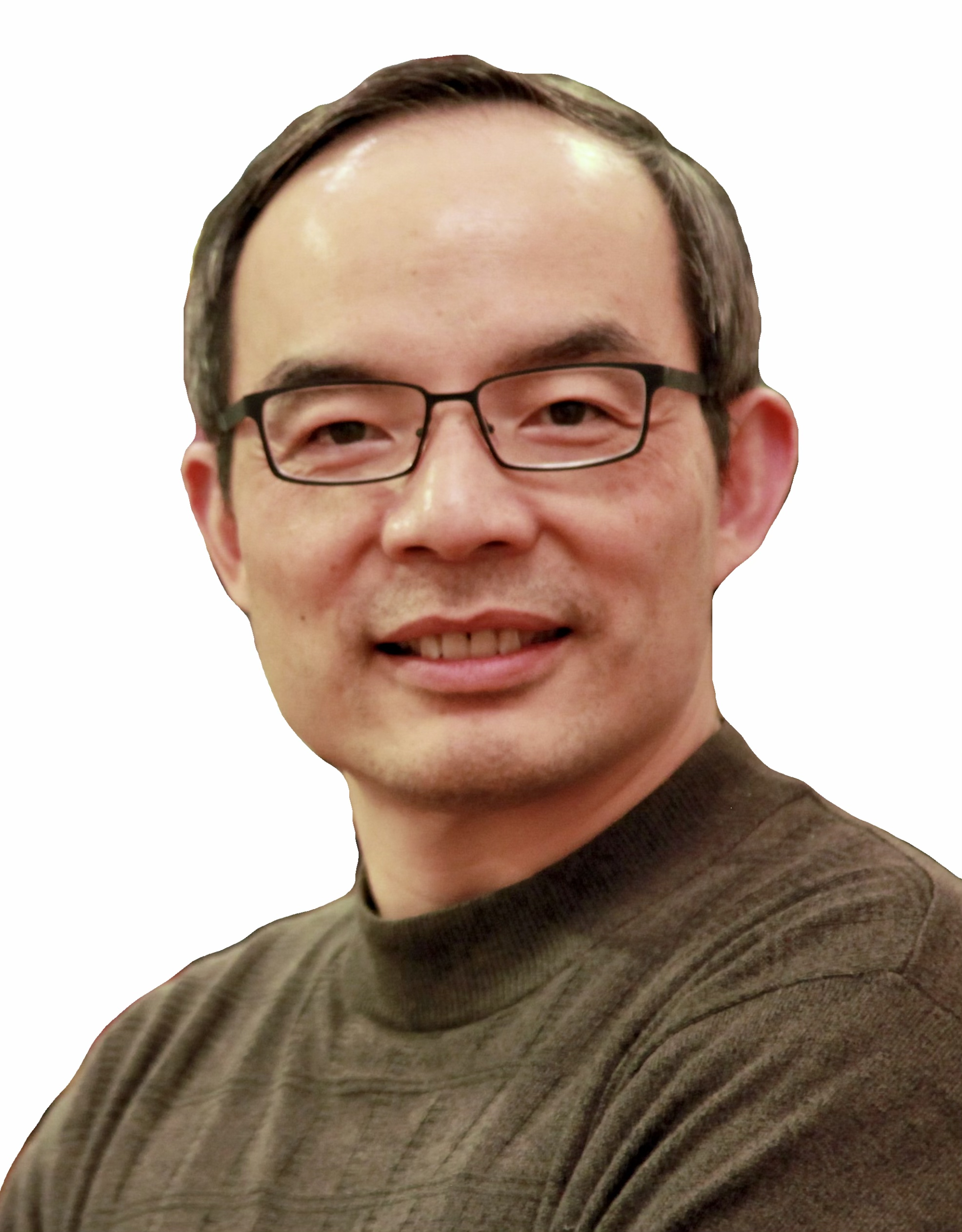
- in 2017
- Born: October 20, 1962 (age 64); China
- Citizenship: United States
- Education: University of Edinburgh; Tsinghua University; Hunan University
- Awards: Ellis Island Medal of Honor; National Academy of Engineering Member; American Academy of Arts and Sciences Member; IEEE Bose Industrial Leader Award; Asian American Corporate Leadership Award; ACM Fellow; IEEE Fellow
- Scientific career
- Fields: Speech Recognition, Machine translation, Natural Language Processing, AI, Computer Vision, Software Development
- Workplaces: Zoom Video Communications; Microsoft; Carnegie Mellon University

Xuedong David Huang (born October 20, 1962) is a Chinese-American computer scientist and technology executive who has made contributions to spoken language processing and artificial intelligence, including Azure AI Services. He is Zoom's chief technology officer after serving as Microsoft's Technical Fellow and Azure AI Chief Technology Officer for 30 years. Huang is a strong advocate of AI for Accessibility, and AI for Cultural Heritage.

== Education ==
Huang received his PhD from the University of Edinburgh in 1989 (sponsored by the British ORS and Edinburgh University Scholarship), his MS from Tsinghua University in 1984, and BS from Hunan University in 1982.

== Career ==
After receiving his PhD in 1989, Huang joined Carnegie Mellon University and worked with Raj Reddy and Kai-Fu Lee on speech recognition. At CMU, he directed the Sphinx-II speech system research which achieved the best performance in every category of DARPA's 1992 benchmarking. Microsoft Research recruited him to found and lead Microsoft's spoken language initiatives in 1993. His co-authored book Spoken Language Processing and his Historical speech recognition review succinctly summarize several generations of spoken language research. As Microsoft's Mr. Speech for three decades, Huang has been instrumental in creating Microsoft's Speech Application Programming Interface (SAPI), shipping Microsoft Speech Server, and modernizing spoken language and integrative AI services via Azure AI, which not only enables millions of 3rd party customers but also powers up Microsoft's Windows, Office, Teams, and Azure OpenAI Services.

Huang helped Microsoft and Azure Cognitive Services achieve multiple industry's first human parity milestones on the following open research tasks: transcribing conversational speech, machine translation, conversational QnA, and computer vision image captioning.

Huang has made significant contributions to the software and AI industry through his executive leadership and his scientific publications, owning more than 170 US patents and impacting billions through Azure AI enabled products and services. In 2016, Wired magazine named him one of 25 Geniuses. In 2021, Azure AI was named the winner of InfoWorld's Technology of the Year Award.

Huang was awarded the Allen Newell research excellence medal in 1992, and IEEE Speech Processing Best Paper in 1993. He was recognized as an IEEE Fellow by Institute of Electrical and Electronics Engineers in 2000, named ACM Fellow by Association for Computing Machinery in 2017, and a member of Washington State Academy of Sciences. Huang received 2022 Asian American Corporate Leadership Award, and IEEE Amar Bose Industrial Leader Award. In 2023, he was elected a member of the US National Academy of Engineering (NAE), and a member of the American Academy of Arts and Sciences.
