= Overseas Research Scholarship =

The Overseas Research Students Awards Scheme (also known as Overseas Research Scholarships, ORS) is an international postgraduate award for selected foreign country nationals to undertake research at higher-education institutions (HEIs) in the United Kingdom. The award is among the most selective and prestigious awards offered to international students and scholarships are awarded on the basis of academic excellence and research potential. The Scheme is funded through the four UK higher education funding bodies (for England, Scotland, Wales and Northern Ireland). As of 2009, ORS scholars may enrol at 165 qualified HEIs - 141 in England, 15 in Scotland, 7 in Wales and 2 in Northern Ireland.

== History ==
The ORS Awards Scheme was set up by the Secretary of State for Education and Science in 1979 and launched in the 1980-1981 academic year, to attract international students to the United Kingdom to undertake doctoral-level research.

The last full awards were given to students starting their studies in 2008 and the scholarship scheme ended that year.

== Notable Scholars ==
- Halyna Ovcharenko – SPNM-shortlisted musician
- Mohammed Rahif Hakmi- Chairman Armada Group
- Xuedong Huang - Microsoft Azure AI CTO
- Alejandro (Alex) Jadad - Physician, scientist and innovator
- Grant Olney Passmore - Mathematician and musician
- Mohamed Muizzu – President of the Maldives
