= BonziBuddy =

Former freeware desktop assistant

- Developers: Bonzi Software, Inc.
- Release: 1999
- Final release: 4.1 / 2005
- Operating system: Microsoft Windows
- Type: Virtual assistant, adware, spyware
- License: Freeware
- Website: www.bonzi.com/bonzibuddy/downloadbuddyfree.asp (archived)

BonziBuddy (/ˈbɒnziˌbʌd.iː/ BON-zee-bud-ee or BON-zih-bud-ee, stylized as BonziBUDDY) is a discontinued freeware desktop virtual assistant created by Joe and Jay Bonzi. Upon a user's choice, it would share jokes and facts, manage downloads, sing songs and talk, among other functions.

BonziBuddy was described as spyware and adware, and was discontinued in 2004 after Bonzi Software, Inc. faced lawsuits and fines regarding the software. The software received a final update removing the offending features, and remained available on the Bonzi.com website until 2005. The Bonzi.com web portal remained open until its closure in late 2008.

== Design ==
The software used Microsoft Agent technology, originally developed for Office Assistant, and initially used Peedy, a green parrot provided as a default character alongside Agent. In May 2000, BonziBuddy received an update featuring its own character: Bonzi, a purple gorilla. The program also used a text-to-speech voice to interact with the user. The voice, named Sydney, was part of the Lernout & Hauspie Microsoft Speech API 4.0 package. It is also referred to in some software as Adult Male #2.

In 2002, an article in Consumer Reports Web Watch labeled BonziBuddy as spyware, stating that it contains a backdoor trojan that collects information from users. The activities the program is said to engage in include constantly resetting the user's web browser homepage to bonzi.com without the user's permission, prompting and tracking various information about the user, installing a browser toolbar, and serving advertisements.

Trend Micro and Symantec have both classified the software as adware. Spyware Guide's entry on the program also states that it is adware.

== Reception ==
A March 2004 newspaper article written about BonziBuddy described it as spyware and a "scourge of the Internet". Another article found in 2006 on the BusinessWeek website described BonziBuddy as "the unbelievably annoying spyware trojan horse".

In April 2007, PC World readers voted BonziBuddy sixth in a list named "The 20 Most Annoying Tech Products". One reader was quoted as criticizing the program because it "kept popping up and obscuring things you needed to see".

== Lawsuits ==
Internetnews.com reported the settlement of a class action suit on 27 May 2003. Originally brought against Bonzi Software on 4 December 2002, the suit accused Bonzi of using its banner advertisements to deceptively imitate Windows computer alerts, alerting the user that their IP address is being broadcast. When clicked, including on the "close" button of the dialog box, the advertisements led the user to marketing web pages for affiliated products, including Bonzi Software's own InternetAlert and InternetBoost. In the settlement, Bonzi Software agreed to modify their ads so that they looked less like Windows dialog boxes and more like actual advertisements.

On February 18, 2004, the Federal Trade Commission released a statement indicating that Bonzi Software, Inc. was ordered to pay US$75,000 in fees, among other aspects, for violating the Children's Online Privacy Protection Act by collecting personal information from children under the age of 13 with BonziBuddy. The original complaint additionally asserts that protection provided by the US$49 InternetAlert is limited, failing to meet the product's advertised claims.

== Legacy ==
While being seen as a nuisance when the product was actively operating, the software received notoriety in retrospect as an internet meme. It is viewed nostalgically as a legacy of computing in the Web 1.0 era, and often compared to the Office Assistant and unwanted browser toolbars. A 2017 article by How-To Geek names it a "terrible application" that "had its charm", providing creativity despite its unwanted features.

In the late 2000s, several parody YouTube videos were uploaded featuring the Bonzi gorilla character and its synthesized voice.

Today, fan-made websites continue to host the original BonziBuddy website and software. In 2007, a parody was released for Mac OS X.

== See also ==
- Virtual pet
- Prody Parrot
- Talking Moose
