= Dr. Sbaitso =

Artificial intelligence speech synthesis program

- Developer: Creative Labs
- Release: 1991; 35 years ago
- Operating system: MS-DOS
- Type: Text-to-Speech Chatbot
- License: Freeware

Dr. Sbaitso (/ˈspeɪtsoʊ/ SPAYT-soh) is an artificial intelligence speech synthesis program released in 1991 by Creative Labs in Singapore for MS-DOS-based personal computers. The name is an acronym for "Sound Blaster Acting Intelligent Text-to-Speech Operator."

== History ==
Dr. Sbaitso was distributed with various sound cards manufactured by Creative Technology in the early 1990s.

The text-to-speech engine used is a version of Monologue, which was developed by First Byte Software. Monologue is a later release of First Byte's "SmoothTalker" software from 1984.

The program "conversed" with the user as if it were a psychologist, though most of its responses were along the lines of "WHY DO YOU FEEL THAT WAY?" rather than any sort of complicated interaction. When confronted with a phrase it could not understand, it would often reply with something such as "THAT'S NOT MY PROBLEM." Dr. Sbaitso repeated text out loud that was typed after the word "SAY." Repeated swearing or abusive behavior on the part of the user caused Dr. Sbaitso to "break down" in a "PARITY ERROR" before resetting itself. The same would happen, if the user types "SAY PARITY."

The program introduced itself with the following lines:

HELLO [UserName], MY NAME IS DOCTOR SBAITSO.

I AM HERE TO HELP YOU.
SAY WHATEVER IS IN YOUR MIND FREELY,
OUR CONVERSATION WILL BE KEPT IN STRICT CONFIDENCE.
MEMORY CONTENTS WILL BE WIPED OFF AFTER YOU LEAVE,

SO, TELL ME ABOUT YOUR PROBLEMS.

The program was designed to showcase the digitized voices the cards were able to produce, though the quality was far from lifelike. Additionally, there was a version of this program for Microsoft Windows through the use of a program called Prody Parrot; this version of the software featured a more detailed graphical user interface. The text-to-speech was also used as the voice of SCP-079 in the video game SCP — Containment Breach, and for 1st Prize in the Baldi's Basics series, albeit slowed down.

== Commands ==
If the user submits "HELP", a list of commands will appear. If the user then submits "M", more commands will appear. There are three pages of commands in total, with guidance on how to use each of the features.

== See also ==
- ALICE
- ELIZA
- History of natural language processing
