= Volodymyr Sirenko =

Ukrainian conductor and music pedagogue (born 1960)

Volodymyr Sirenko Володимир Сіренко
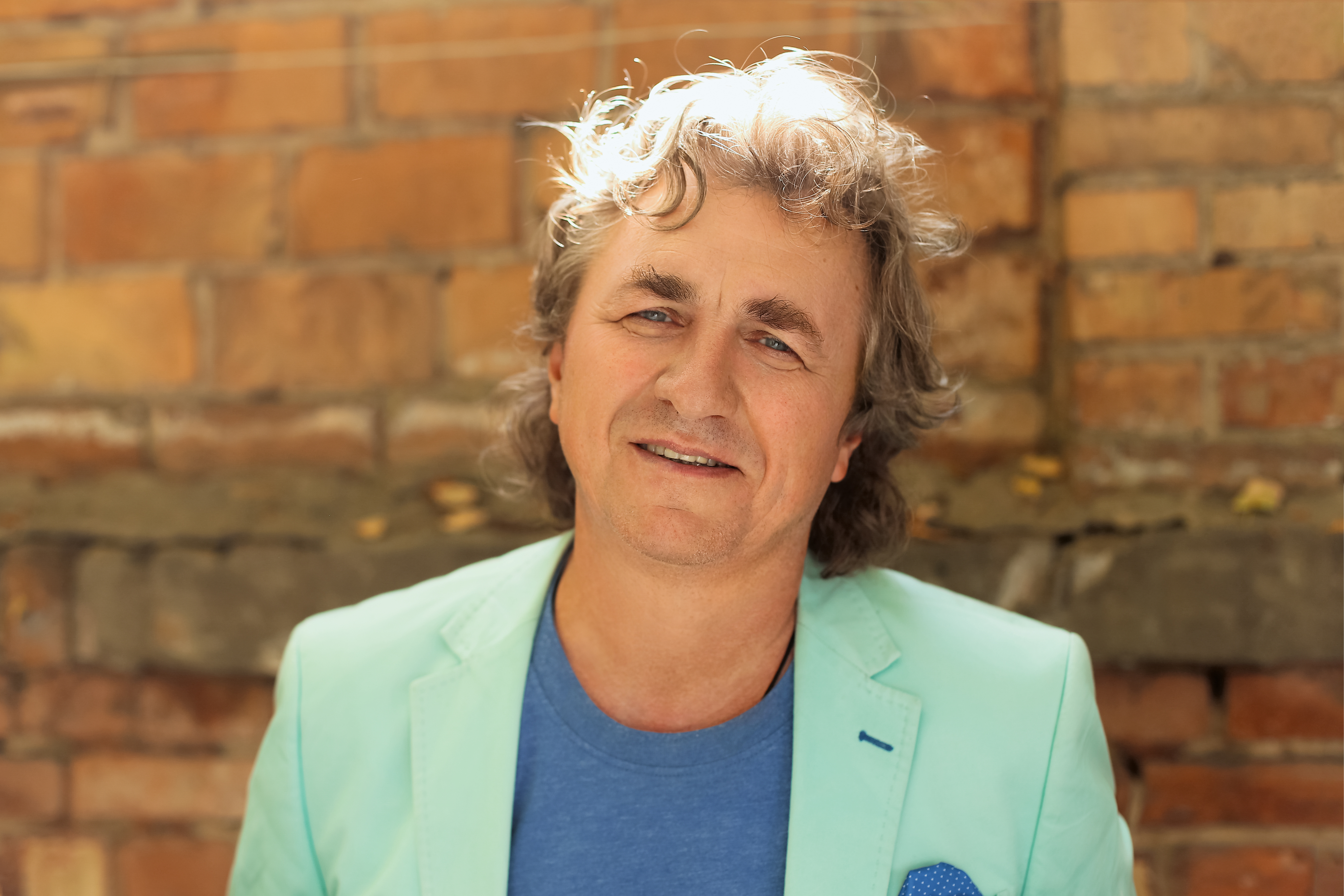

Background information
- Born: November 1, 1960 (age 65); Pokrovska Bahachka, Ukrainian SSR, Soviet Union
- Genres: Classical
- Occupations: Conductor; Teacher

Volodymyr Fedorovych Sirenko (Note: Ukrainian: Володимир Федорович Сіренко, romanized: Volodymyr Fedorovych Sirenko) (born 1 November 1960) is a Ukrainian conductor and music pedagogue. He is best known as chief conductor of the National Symphony Orchestra of Ukraine where he has been artistic director since 1999. In 2008, he was honoured as People's Artist of Ukraine.

In his early twenties, Sirenko made his conducting debut in the National Philharmonic of Ukraine, Kyiv. In 1989, he studied opera-symphonic conducting with Allin Vlasenko at the Tchaikovsky National Music Academy of Ukraine.

In 1990, Sirenko was a finalist in the Václav Talich International Conducting Competition held in Prague. He was Principal Conductor of the Ukrainian Radio Symphony Orchestra between 1991 and 1999.

He is known for taking on the compositions of Ukrainian composers, such as Halyna Ovcharenko and Hennadii Liashenko, which were included in a concert given by the Ukraine State Radio and Television Orchestra in December 2014.

In 2005, his recording of Ukrainian composer Valentyn Silvestrov's Requiem for Larissa was nominated for a Grammy Award.

== Awards ==
- Merited Artist of Ukraine
- Art Worker of Ukraine
- People's Artist of Ukraine
- Order of Prince Yaroslav the Wise, 5th class
- Art worker of the Russian Federation
- Taras Shevchenko National Prize (2001)

== Recordings ==
- Requiem for Larissa (2004), Valentin Silvestrov. (ECM New Series, ECM 1778)
- Mirror of Eternity (2004) (Quartz: QTZ2015)
- Mirror of Eternity (2012) Khoury, H; Khachaturian: Flute Concerto; Stankovych: Chamber Symphony No. 3. (Nimbus: NI6168)
- Myroslav Skoryk: Violin Concertos (Complete), Vol. 1 – Nos. 1–4 (2020) (Naxos: 8.574088)
- Myroslav Skoryk: Violin Concertos (Complete), Vol. 2 – Nos. 5–9 (2020) (Naxos: 8.574089)
