= Intelligent user interface =

User interface type

An intelligent user interface (intelligent UI, IUI, or sometimes interface agent) is a user interface (UI) that involves some aspect of artificial intelligence (AI or computational intelligence). There are many modern examples of IUIs, the most famous (or infamous) being the Microsoft Office Assistant, whose most recognizable agentive representation was called "Clippy".

Generally, an IUI involves the computer-side having sophisticated knowledge of the domain and/or a model of the user. These allow the interface to better understand the user's needs and personalize or guide the interaction.

== History ==
Probably the earliest examples of what could be considered true IUIs appeared in the Intelligent Computer Assisted Instruction (ICAI, aka. intelligent tutoring systems) community, which arose in the 1960s and 1970s and become popular (among academics) in the 1980s. Also, in the early 1980s, as expert systems took hold in the AI community, expert systems were applied to UIs (e.g., the aptly-named "WIZARD" system). In the 1990s the application of plan inference to interaction formed the basis for research in what then was named natural interfaces (the term has later come to evolve to mean full-body interaction). Later IUIs, such as Clippy, are more statistically-based, using machine learning methods to decide how to tune the interactive experience to the individual user. In the 2000s this strand of research often is labeled personalization, most often employing various recommender system techniques to adapt the behavior of an interface or an entire interactive system to individual user preferences.

== Definitional difficulty ==
What constitutes "intelligent" is potentially disputable, as is what counts as an "interface". The field is in practice defined by the community of researchers and the channels they publish in.

== Research ==
Research in intelligent user interfaces is published in general Human-Computer Interaction conferences and journals such as CHI or UIST as well as in some artificial intelligence research channels such as those hosted by the AAAI, but most importantly there are the dedicated conference series on Intelligent User Interfaces (since 1988), Recommender Systems (since 2007), and User Modeling, Adaptation and Personalization as well as the journal User Modeling and User-Adapted Interaction (since 1990).

== Humanizing cues ==
As practical concept of social interface design, social interface is seen in the studies of human-computer interaction (in particular, its computer interface aspect). The basic thesis is that where a computer interface is more akin to another human, it can facilitate correct responses from users during human-to-computer interaction. Software that can provide such humanizing cues often does it by creating interface with human-like quality (such as giving recognizable gender to a software agent). Studies are often concerned with how should such agents (like the Microsoft Agent) be designed to make them more appealing (is having facial expressions efficient, should the agent be anthropomorphic, and so on).

== See also ==
- Natural language user interface
  - Chatterbot
- Recommender system

== Links ==
- AAAI Conference
- International Conference on Intelligent User Interfaces
- ACM Conference On Recommender Systems
- Journal on User Modeling and User-Adapted Interaction
