= Halyna Ovcharenko =

Ukrainian composer

Dr. Halyna Ovcharenko is an SPNM-shortlisted composer. Born in Luhansk in Ukraine, Halyna Ovcharenko was given a scholarship at the age of eleven to the Musical College of the Kiev State Tchaikovsky Conservatory, a specialist school for talented children. Whilst at the Conservatory, she studied composition with Yurii Ishchenko unil 1987. After graduating in Music from the Conservatory, she continued her study of composition in Warsaw. She subsequently taught composition and music theory at the Kiev State Conservatory and the Sumy Pedagogical Institute, also giving master classes in composition and authentic voice performance in Poland and Serbia.

Halyna Ovcharenko is the director of the folk music ensemble Malva and is a member of the Union of Ukrainian Composers. In 1996 she was given the Overseas Research Scholarship to study for a Ph.D. in composition at University of Bath. Amongst her works are pieces for solo piano, piano and voice, percussion, chamber orchestra, choir and symphony orchestra. Her work, The Sun Scorched Mallow for choir, orchestra, soloists and reciter was awarded first prize in the Marian and Ivanna Kotz competition in 1992. In 1995 she was the winner of the International Women Composers' Competition in Ukraine with her work Everlasting for chamber orchestra and ensemble of authentic voices.

Amongst her works are pieces for solo instruments, ensembles, choirs, chamber and symphony orchestras, music for theatre and documentary film. She has written two ballets, one of them, The Last Battle, (after C.S. Lewis) was successfully performed by the LCB at the Peacock Theatre and Sadler's Wells Theatre in London. The other, Kupala's Night, was selected by the ISCM and was performed by the Ljubljana National Opera and Ballet Theatre.

She won international competitions in 1992 and 1995. In 1992, she received the National Leontovych Prize. Recently she has received awards from The Bliss Trust, the Arts Council England and the PRS Foundation. Her composition Invocation of Rain for four percussionists and authentic voice was performed at the festival in Bucharest in 2004 and at the ISCM World Music Days in Zagreb in 2005. What the Shaman Saw was performed at the Festival in Bucharest in June 2005. String Quartet was performed by the Voller String Quartet in Bristol in May. Halyna has been offered a Grant to work at the Visby Studio in September 2005. In December 2014, she was one of three composers to have a work performed by the State Radio and Television Orchestra under the direction of Ukrainian conductor Volodymyr Sirenko.

Halyna has taught composition and music theory at Kiev State Conservatory and the Sumy Pedagogical Institute, and has also given masterclasses in composition and authentic voice performance in Poland and Serbia.

== The Last Battle ==
The Last Battle was a ballet performed by the London Children's Ballet in the London West End

…Halyna Ovcharenko’s colouristic, through-composed score for small orchestra gives the undertaking a fierce professional gloss, ranging from plangent folktunes to terrifying brass climaxes worthy of Prokofiev. There were moments when, with realistic campfire blazing, the stage thick with battle-smoke and mustering armies, and another orchestral pile-up brewing, you had pinch yourself to believe this was a children’s show. - The Independent on Sunday

…Above all, the contributions of two young professionals made the ballet’s success possible: Halyna Ovcharenko's lively, expressive score, and the choreography of Tom Sapsford which never played down to his performers' inexperience - The Independent

== Awards ==
- Awarded Laureate of the Ukrainian National Choral works Competition, Kiev, Ukraine (1992)
- Awarded prize at the International Marian and Ivanna Kotz Competition for the work The Sun-scorched Mallow. Cantata for choir, symphony orchestra, soloists and reciter. Lyrics by Valentina Otroschenko (1992)
- Laureate of the Ukrainian National Choral Works Competition (Kiev, 1992)
- Winner of the International Women Composers Competition (Kiev, 1995) with a composition for Chamber Orchestra and ensemble of Authentic voices
- Recipient of the University of Bristol Scholarship and Overseas Students Scholarship for MMus/Ph.D. in the Music Composition course at the University of Bristol
- Awarded scholarship from the University of Amsterdam to attend Summer Course. Subject Hidden messages: Culture and communication (1998)
- Winner of the Raymond Warren Prize in Music Composition at the University of Bristol (1998 & 1999)
- Winner of the ISCM competition Three World Ballets for the ballet Kupala's Night to be performed by Ljubljana National Opera and Ballet Theatre (2002)
- Recipient of the PRS award (2003)
- Awarded a Grant from the Art Council of England (2004)
- Award from The Bliss Trust (2004)
- Invocation of Rain shortlisted by the SPNM (2004)
