= Microsoft Agent =

Software avatar toolkit

- Logo as of 2001

- Microsoft provides examples on its website for the use of Agent.
- Original author: Microsoft
- Initial release: September 8, 1997; 28 years ago
- Stable release: 2.0 / October 12, 1998; 27 years ago
- Operating system: Microsoft Windows
- Available in: Multiple languages
- Website: microsoft.com/products/msagent at the Wayback Machine (archived 2003-02-03)

Microsoft Agent is a virtual assistant user interface developed by Microsoft which employs animated characters, text-to-speech engines, and speech recognition software to enhance interaction with computer users. It could be used to present interactions with an intelligent assistant.

It came pre-installed as part of Windows 2000 and later versions of Microsoft Windows up to Windows Vista. It was not included with Windows 7, and wasn't completely discontinued in Windows 8. Microsoft Agent functionality was exposed as an ActiveX control that can be used by web pages.

The theory behind the software came from work on social interfaces by Clifford Nass and Byron Reeves at Stanford's Center for the Study of Language and Information.

== Version history ==
Interactive character technology was first introduced in Microsoft Bob, which used an early version of Microsoft Agent technology internally referred to as "Microsoft Actor". It was the code used in the initial version of the Office Assistant in Microsoft Office 97. Microsoft Agent was subsequently created by Tandy Trower in an attempt to offer technology that was more flexible and available to third-party developers to include in their applications and web pages. The software release also included four interactive characters as well as a utility that enables developers to assemble their own characters and interactions.

Microsoft Agent replaced the original Microsoft Actor code in Office 2000, although this use did not include Agent's much-touted speech synthesis or recognition capabilities or any of the four Microsoft Agent sample characters. Instead, the Office team created their own characters, including one named "Clippit" (commonly dubbed "Clippy"). However, Microsoft Bob Actors and Office 97 assistants are incompatible with Office 2000 and later versions, and vice versa.

The initial version of Microsoft Agent was quietly released on MSDN in 1997.

== Technology ==
Microsoft Agent characters are stored in files of the .ACS extension or in a single .ACF file for character definitions, and multiple .ACA files (one per animation, formerly .AAF) for better World Wide Web distribution. Microsoft Office 97 and Microsoft Bob Actor characters are stored in files of the .ACT extension. Microsoft Agent character definition files are stored in files of the .ACD file extension, and are generated by the Microsoft Agent Character Editor.

The speech engine itself is driven by the Microsoft Speech API (SAPI), version 4 and above. Microsoft SAPI provides a control panel for easily installing and switching between various available Text to Speech and Speech to Text engines, as well as voice training and scoring systems to improve the quality and accuracy of both engines.

Microsoft provided four agent characters for free, downloaded from the Microsoft Agent website. These were called Peedy, Merlin, Genie, and Robby. Some characters also shipped with Microsoft Office up to Office 2003 as the Office Assistants and with Windows XP as search assistants. New Microsoft Agent characters could also be created using Microsoft's development tools, including the Agent Character Editor. Agents can be embedded in software with Visual Basic for Applications and in web pages with VBScript, and automated tools for the purpose of simplifying this exist. However, web page agents were only compatible with Internet Explorer, since alternative browsers like Opera or Mozilla Firefox do not support ActiveX.

== Support after Windows XP ==
In Windows Vista, Microsoft Agent uses Speech API (SAPI) version 5.3 as its primary text-to-speech provider. (In previous versions of Windows, Agent uses SAPI version 4, which is not supported in Windows Vista and later.) Beginning with Vista, multilingual features of Microsoft Agent under a particular language version of the OS are not supported; that is, Agent will function in other languages only under a localized Windows version of the same language.

Microsoft announced in April 2009 that all Microsoft Agent development and support will be discontinued with the release of Windows 7. Microsoft is no longer offering licenses or distributing the SDK.

However, due to customer feedback, Microsoft provided an installation package of the Microsoft Agent core components for use on Windows 7. The download supported SAPI 5.3 compatible speech engines, and also contained the character “Merlin”, which shipped with Windows Vista.

== See also ==
- Embodied agent
- BonziBuddy

Microsoft

- Office Assistant
- Microsoft Voice Command
- Cortana
- Microsoft Bob
- Windows XP
