= Microsoft Office Picture Manager =

Raster graphics editor by Microsoft

- Microsoft Office Picture Manager on Windows XP with its menu bar, toolbars, shortcut pane, and task pane
- Developer: Microsoft
- Initial release: August 19, 2003; 22 years ago
- Final release: 14.0.2015.10 (SP2) / July 16, 2013; 12 years ago
- Operating system: Microsoft Windows
- Type: Raster graphics editor
- License: Proprietary
- Website: support.microsoft.com/en-us/office/where-is-picture-manager-58837c3e-34db-4904-95e8-4eca7b7c5730

Microsoft Office Picture Manager (formerly Microsoft Picture Library) is a raster graphics editor introduced in Microsoft Office 2003 and included up to Office 2010. It is the replacement to Microsoft Photo Editor introduced in Office 97 and included up to Office XP.

Basic image editing features include color correct, crop, flip, resize, and rotate. To facilitate image organization, Picture Manager includes a shortcut pane to which users can manually—or automatically through a Locate Pictures command—add shortcuts to folders in a hierarchical file system layout, which eliminates the need to create new categories for images or to import them to a specific folder. Picture Manager allows users to share images in email, to an intranet location, or to a SharePoint library. It also allows images to be shared directly with Excel, Outlook, PowerPoint, and Word.

Microsoft terminated support for Picture Manager with the release of Office 2013 and recommended Photos and Word as replacements because of their digital imaging capabilities.

== History ==
Picture Manager (known at the time as Picture Library) was first released in 2002 alongside Office 2003 (then known as Office 11) Beta 1 and included crop, red-eye removal, resize, and rotate features. In Office 2003 Beta 2, released in March 2003, it retained its preliminary Picture Library name and integrated with SharePoint by automatically opening when users added multiple images to a library; users could access these images from within other Office 2003 applications with the Shared Workspace task pane.

Picture Manager is included in Office 2003 through Office 2010; it was no longer included with versions of Microsoft Office starting with Office 2013. However, it is available as an optional component in SharePoint Designer 2007 and can be installed as a standalone application; SharePoint Designer 2007 was made available in 2009 as freeware. Picture Manager is also available as an optional component of SharePoint Designer 2010. With the release of Microsoft Office 2010 SP2 in 2013, Microsoft updated Picture Manager to resolve an issue that caused it to crash when Internet Explorer compatibility mode was active.

== Features ==
The Edit Pictures task pane with image editing options

The user interface of Picture Manager consists of menus, toolbars, a shortcut pane, and task panes; it supports editing and navigation keyboard shortcuts. Users can manually add folder shortcuts to the shortcut pane or automatically populate the pane with folders that include images through a Locate Pictures command, which eliminates the need for users to create new image categories or to import images from another location. The shortcut pane by default does not list any folders. Images displayed in Picture Manager can be viewed individually or in filmstrip or thumbnail arrangements, and users can zoom in or out of images. Picture Manager does not display GIF image animation and, like the version of Photo Editor included with Office XP, does not support the PCX image format.

Basic image editing features include color correct, crop, flip, resize, and rotate. Advanced features include brightness, contrast, hue, and saturation adjustment; batch processing; compression; and red-eye removal. An AutoCorrect command can automatically adjust brightness, contrast, and color. All editing capabilities are listed on an Edit Pictures task pane. Images can be compressed with options for insertion into documents, email, or web pages. After editing, users can view or discard unsaved changes, overwrite the original image, rename and save the new image, or export it to another location. Users can also share images in email, to an intranet location, or to a SharePoint library. Picture Manager users running Windows 2000 cannot print images from the application, as this feature requires a wizard distributed with Windows XP.

== Comparison with Photo Editor ==
Picture Manager lacks several image editing features of its predecessor, Photo Editor, including emboss, noise reduction, RGB gamma correction options, smudge, and unsharp mask features. The following effects of Photo Editor are not included in Picture Manager: Chalk and Charcoal, Edge, Graphic Pen, Negative, Notepaper, Posterize, Sharpen, Soften, Stained Glass, Stamp, Texturizer, and Watercolor. Picture Manager also cannot create new images from a digital camera or from a scanner. Microsoft stated that this feature is native to Windows Explorer in Windows XP and that users are not required to import images to manage them.

Microsoft has published instructions on how to reinstall Photo Editor. Historically, a similar reduction in features occurred when Photo Editor of Office 97 replaced Microsoft Imager of Office 95.

== See also ==
- Comparison of raster graphics editors
- History of Microsoft Office
- Imaging for Windows
- List of raster graphics editors
- Microsoft Paint
- Microsoft PhotoDraw
- Paint 3D
- Windows Essentials
- Windows Photo Gallery
- Windows Photo Viewer
