= Talking Moose =

Animated talking utility for the Apple Macintosh

- Original author: Steven Halls
- Release: 1986; 40 years ago
- Stable release: 3.5.7 (Uli's Moose)
- Operating system: Mac OS Classic, Mac OS X
- Type: Novelty
- Website: talkingmoose.com

Talking Moose is an animated talking utility for the Apple Macintosh. It was created in 1986 by Canadian programmer Steven Halls. It is the first animated talking agent on a personal computer. The program featured a moose that would appear at periodic intervals to tell a joke or witticism. The moose would also comment on system events and user actions.

== Design ==
According to Halls, the original purpose of Talking Moose was to make use of the Mac's Macintalk text-to-speech engine in a novel manner. Apple's development of Macintalk had slowed, and Apple granted Halls permission to use, and continue refining, the software for free.

Halls gave the titular moose character a library of comedic observations and wisecracks which gave it a distinctive character. The software drew inspiration from a Doonesbury strip in which the characters were commented on by a talking computer. Halls found that a moose head with antlers was recognizable even on low-resolution computer screens.

Talking Moose was the first facially animated talking agent with lip synchronization. It served as the inspiration for future digital assistant programs with speech capabilities, such as the Office Assistant in Microsoft Office, BonziBuddy, and Prody Parrot from MindMaker.

Around 1990, a version of the Talking Moose software was commercially published by Baseline Publishing. This commercial release of the Talking Moose included color graphics and additional software that allowed users to create and edit phrases to be spoken. A stripped-down version of the Baseline release of Talking Moose was distributed with the Bob LeVitus book Stupid Mac Tricks in 1989.

In the 1990s, Talking Moose was rewritten by Uli Kusterer under the name Uli's Moose - for which he later obtained Steve Halls' blessing. Uli's Moose was included in Bob LeVitus' iMac (and iBook) book "I Didn't Know You Could Do That".

== Versions ==
Version 1.0 of Talking Moose was released in 1986 by Steve Halls.

Version 2.0 was released in 1987, and ran on Macintosh systems 6.0.4 - 7.1. The Macintalk voice used for the Moose was 'Fred'.

Around 1990, Baseline Publishing commercially published Talking Moose, and released version 4, introducing new characters from a "Cartoon Carnival" supposedly run by the titular character.

Uli Kusterer, the developer of Uli's Moose, removed "Cartoon Carnival" with the release of version 2.1. It supports System 7.1 - Mac OS 9.2. These were released initially on CompuServe, and later on the internet. Uli also developed the first OS X native version (v3.0.5) of Talking Moose, which works with all PowerPC versions of Mac OS X 10.3 through 10.7. The last Macintosh version of Uli's Moose (v3.5.7) is an Intel 32-bit binary, and works on macOS 10.9 - 10.14 (Mojave), and includes Universal Binaries for PowerPC and Intel.

Mack the Moose — With the discontinuation of the 32-bit Talking Moose on the Mac, a new version of the software was needed to support Apple's new M1 Macs. A Canadian developer, John Penner, wrote a new M1-compatible Moose-type program in Swift for macOS Tahoe and Apple Silicon. which was released on the App store in November 2025.

Since January 8, 2009, an account representing Talking Moose has been posting periodic comments on Twitter. The account was banned, but has since been reinstated.

In 2019, the original Talking Moose developer Steven Halls created a new 3D Talking Moose for Microsoft Windows.
