= Spectre AI =

United States software company

Spectre AI Incorporated was a private software company that held contracts with government agencies and defense contractors in the early 2000s. The company was founded around 2000 in Spokane, Washington.

In 2004, the company revealed that it was working on public facing technology and developed the US Army's first AI recruiter, SGT STAR. The project later became controversial, and was the subject of numerous FOIA requests by the Electronic Frontier Foundation over fears that the mechanism was overly invasive.

== History ==
Spectre AI Incorporated was founded by Philip Galland and Robert Hust.

Spectre AI's initial contract with Raytheon was the direct result of a request on the floor of the United States Congress on September 13, 2001, by Senators Judd Gregg and Ernest Hollings.

Galland, initially the company's primary investor, left his position at Oracle to become the company's CEO. In 2004, He and Hust went on to form Agent Science Technologies, Inc.

In late 2002 the company merged with Next-IT where it continued to operate as a wholly owned subsidiary.{
