= SGT STAR =

SGT STAR, also known as Sgt. Star or Sergeant Star, was a chatbot operated by the United States Army to answer questions about recruitment.

== Background ==
After the September 11 attacks, traffic increased significantly to chatrooms on the U.S. Army's website, goarmy.com, increasing costs of staffing the live chatrooms. As a cost-cutting measure, the SGT STAR project was initiated as a partnership between the United States Army Accessions Command and Spectre AI, a wholly owned subsidiary of Next IT. Next IT, a Spokane, Washington-based company deploys "intelligent virtual assistants," using its software dubbed "ActiveAgent" which is a framework for functional presence engines.

Testing began in 2003, and SGT STAR launched to the public in 2006. "STAR" is an acronym for "strong, trained and ready." SGT STAR was launched as a chat interface on goarmy.com, but has since been developed as a mobile application, as well as a life-size animated projection that has appeared live at public events. SGT STAR can also interact with users on Facebook.

== FOIA request ==
In 2013, the Electronic Frontier Foundation filed a Freedom of Information Act request to learn more about SGT STAR, including input and output patterns (questions and answers), usage statistics, contracts, and privacy policies. They received these records in April 2014, after coverage from various media outlets and a tongue-in-cheek campaign to "Free Sgt. Star."
