= Microsoft Sort =

Early software utility from Microsoft

- Photo of case
- Original author(s): Microsoft
- Initial release: 1983; 42 years ago
- Written in: COBOL
- Operating system: Apple II, IIe, CP/M-80 and MS-DOS
- License: Proprietary commercial software

Microsoft Sort is a software utility developed by the Microsoft Corporation in 1982–83. It was sold in two versions – as a standalone utility and as a version hosted in Microsoft COBOL.

The 95 page ring-bound manual describes the function of the software as follows: "Microsoft Standalone SORT is a programmable sorting and merging utility. It accepts data files and arranges the records contained in these files in the order you assign. You may specify sequence keys, which are specific data field(s) within each record, for comparison of records. Also, you may specify a selection procedure."

The software came on a single 5¼" floppy diskette. The software and manual came packaged in a hinged Perspex box, which Microsoft described as "EaselBox". It was designed to double up as a book stand for the reference manual.

At the time of sale, Microsoft Sort was one of 32 products available from the company including productivity software, educational software, recreational software, hardware and programming languages.
