= Office Assistant =

Assistive tools for Microsoft Office

Clippy, the default Office Assistant, as seen in Microsoft Office 2000 through 2003

The Microsoft Office Assistant is a discontinued virtual assistant for Microsoft Office. It assisted users by way of an interactive animated character which interfaced with the Office help content. It was included in Microsoft Office, in Microsoft Publisher, Microsoft Project, and Microsoft FrontPage. It had a wide selection of characters to choose from, with the best-known being a paperclip called Clippy, who was formerly known as Clippit. The Office Assistant and particularly Clippy have been the subject of numerous criticisms and parodies.

== Description ==
The Office Assistant was an intelligent user interface for Microsoft Office. It assisted users by way of an interactive animated character that interfaced with the Office help content. It was included in Microsoft Office for Windows (versions 97 to 2003), in Microsoft Publisher and Microsoft Project (versions 98 to 2003), Microsoft FrontPage (versions 2002 and 2003), and Microsoft Office for Mac (versions 98 to 2004).

The default assistant in the English version was named Clippit, after a paperclip. The character was designed by Kevan J. Atteberry. Although the name Clippit was used in all versions of Microsoft Office that supported the Office Assistant feature, the assistant became commonly referred to by the public as Clippy, a name which later occasionally bled into Microsoft marketing materials. Clippy was by far the most notable (partly because in many cases the setup CD was required to install the other assistants), which also led to his being called simply the Microsoft Paperclip.

=== Technology ===
The Office Assistant used technology initially from Microsoft Bob, and later Microsoft Agent, offering advice based on Bayesian algorithms. From Microsoft Office 2000 onward, Microsoft Agent (.acs) replaced the Microsoft Bob-descended Actor (.act) format as the technology supporting the feature. Microsoft Agent-based characters have richer forms and colors, and are not enclosed within a boxed window. Furthermore, Microsoft Agent characters could use the Lernout & Hauspie TruVoice Text-to-Speech Engine to provide output speech capabilities, but it required SAPI 4.0. The Microsoft Speech Recognition Engine also allowed Microsoft Agent characters to accept speech input. This technology was also used for the File Explorer's search companions in Windows XP.

== History ==
According to Alan Cooper, the "Father of Visual Basic", the concept of Clippy was based on a "tragic misunderstanding" of research conducted at Stanford University, by Clifford Nass and Byron Reeves, showing that people treat computers as social actors – responding with emotional and social responses as if they were other human beings and this is the reason people yell at their computer monitors. Microsoft concluded that if humans reacted to computers the same way they react to other humans, it would be beneficial to include a human-like face in their software. As people already related to computers directly as they do with humans, the added human-like face emerged as an annoying interloper distracting the user from the primary conversation.

First introduced in Microsoft Office 97, the Office Assistant was code-named TFC during development, for "That Fucking Clown". It appeared when the program determined the user could be assisted by using Office wizards, searching help, or advising users on using Office features more effectively. It also presented tips and keyboard shortcuts. For example, typing an address followed by "Dear" would cause the Assistant to appear with the message, "It looks like you're writing a letter. Would you like help?"

Microsoft turned off the feature by default in Office XP, and as a result they focused most of their marketing on that change.

They created the now-defunct website officeclippy.com and hosted three flash cartoons starring a newly unemployed Clippy (now officially being referred to as Clippy), a song sung by Clippy, and a flash video game called Office XP (Xtract Paperclip) where the player would use office supplies to slay an army of Clippys. On May 31, 2001, during the Office XP launch event in New York City, a man in a Clippy mascot costume interrupts the introduction and gives a speech begging for his job back before being dragged off stage by a comically large magnet. Notably, Clippy is voiced by Gilbert Gottfried during this ad campaign. Later that November, Microsoft published the video game Bicycle Card Games for Windows computers, featuring Clippy as a playable character, with Gilbert Gottfried reprising his role.

On May 11, 2004, Microsoft released Microsoft Office 2003, which was the last version of Microsoft Office to feature the Office Assistant.

== Assistants ==
When the Office Assistant feature was introduced in Office 97, the user could choose which character is displayed while they use the program. The list of characters that the user could choose from include:

- Clippy (the anthropomorphic paperclip most are familiar with, the default option in most of the Microsoft Office editions that supported Office Assistant)
- The Dot (a shape-shifting smiley-faced red ball) previously from Microsoft Bob.
- The Genius (a caricature of Albert Einstein, removed in Office XP but available as a downloadable add-on)
- Hoverbot (a robot)
- Kairu (カイル) (a dolphin available for East Asian editions, also downloadable for other regions)
- Office Logo (a jigsaw puzzle composed of four pieces, which was the logo for Microsoft Office 9x. There was also an additional downloadable silent, immobile version of the character with a minor redesign)
- Mother Nature (a globe)
- Power Pup (a superhero dog)
- Scribble (an origami-esque cat)
- Will (a caricature of William Shakespeare), previously from Microsoft Bob.

In Microsoft Office 2000 and beyond, the Hoverbot, Scribble, Power Pup, and Will assistants were removed, and new Office Assistants were introduced in their place:

- F1 (a robot who was previously downloadable for Office 97, included in Microsoft Office 2000 & beyond)
- Links (a cat who was previously downloadable for Office 97, included in Microsoft Office 2000 & beyond)
- Rocky (a dog included in Microsoft Office 2000 & beyond)
- Merlin (a wizard inspired by the character of the same name, introduced in Office XP)

The Clippy, Office Logo, and Kairu assistants were also redesigned to have a more three dimensional appearance. The removed assistants later resurfaced as downloadable add-ons along with other additional assistants.

=== Exclusive Assistants ===
In Microsoft Office 98 and 2001, MacOS exclusive editions of Microsoft Office, all of the built in Office 97 assistants were included (also retaining their Office 97 designs) along with an additional three assistants:

- Bosgrove (a butler exclusive to MacOS)
- Earl the cat (a blue cat, also downloadable for Office 97)
- Max (a Macintosh Plus computer exclusive to MacOS)

The Office XP Multilingual Pack had two more assistants for Asian language users in non-Asian Office versions:

- Saeko Sensei (冴子先生) (an animated teacher available for East Asian editions)
- The Monkey King (Chinese: 孫悟空) (based on the fictional character Sun Wukong, available for East Asian editions)

In 1999, there was a partnership between Microsoft and the Japanese talk show Sanma no Manma (さんまのまんま) hosted by comedian Sanma Akashiya, where if a customer in Japan were to purchase a copy of Microsoft Office 2000 Upgrade Edition, they would be mailed a promotional CD that would install the show's mascot Manma-chan (まんまちゃん), an alien that resembles a dog as an additional Office Assistant.

== Criticism ==
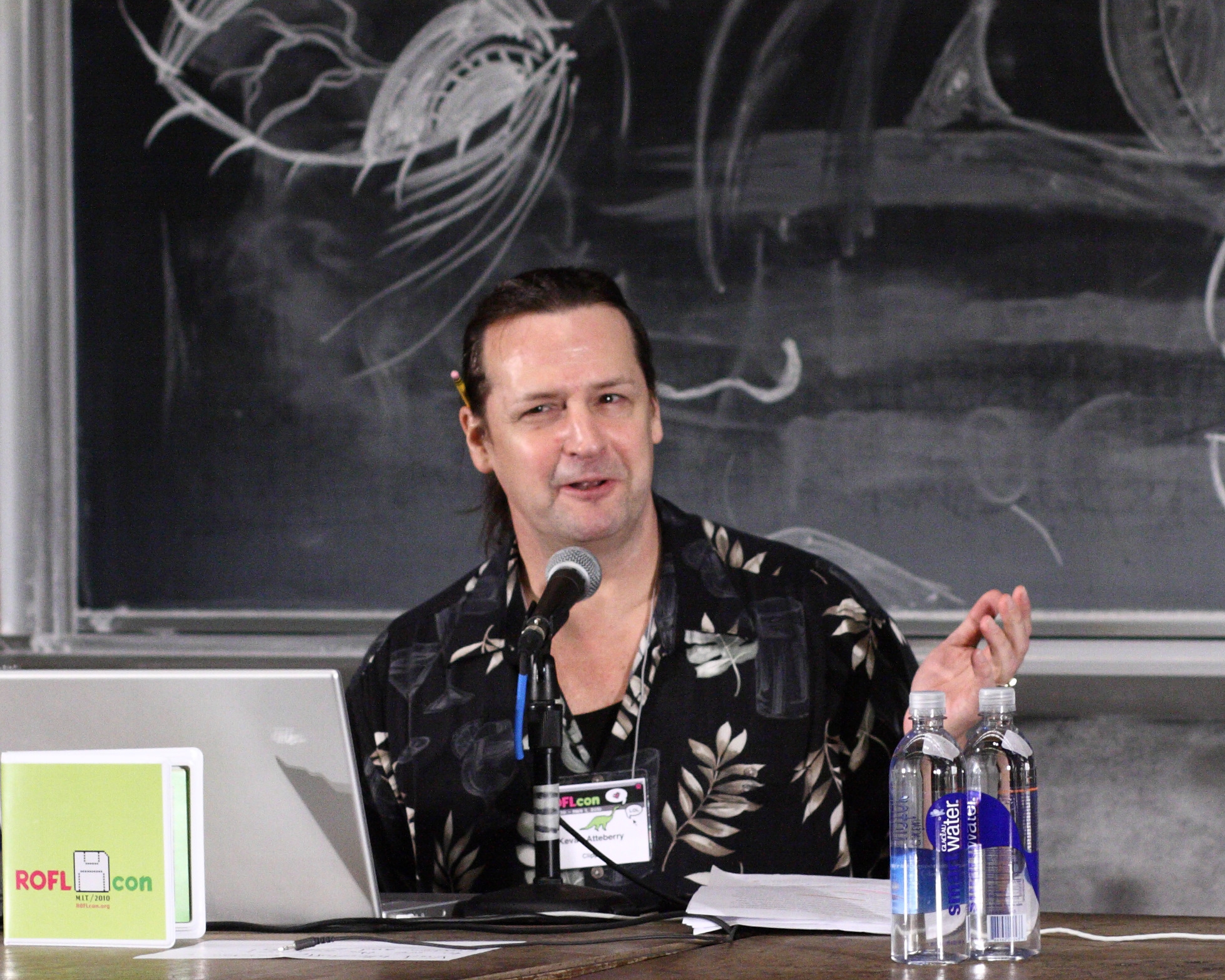
Clippy creator Kevan Atteberry discussing his much-maligned character at ROFLCon II

Despite the Office Assistant's intention of being helpful, it was widely reviled among users as intrusive and annoying, and was criticized even within Microsoft. Microsoft's internal codename TFC had a derogatory origin: Steven Sinofsky states that "C" stood for "clown", while allowing his readers to guess what "TF" might stand for. Smithsonian Magazine called Clippy "one of the worst software design blunders in the annals of computing". Time magazine included Clippy in a 2010 article listing the fifty worst inventions.

Although helpful to brand-new users, and introduced at a time when relatively few people had extensive experience with computers, the Office Assistant feature was criticized for interrupting users and not providing advice that was fully adapted to the situation.

== Legacy ==
On January 30, 2007, Microsoft Office 2007 was released with the Office Assistant feature being fully removed, and it has remained that way in all subsequent releases of Microsoft Office. Later that same year, Microsoft hosted the TechEd 2007 conference, which featured a keynote opening that parodied Back to the Future. In the opening, then Microsoft president Bob Muglia and Christopher Lloyd (reprising his role as Doc Brown from the movie) use the DeLorean to travel across time, eventually arriving at an alternate future where unsuccessful Microsoft products become a reality. The alternate future is depicted as a white void with a threatening hologram of the smiley face logo from Microsoft Bob alongside a sarcastic Clippy hologram. Gilbert Gottfried does not reprise his role as Clippy this time.

In May 2009, as way to promote Microsoft Office 2010, Microsoft created a website that hosted a trailer for a fake movie titled "Office 2010 - The Movie." The trailer featured a photograph of Clippy along with his tombstone, referencing the removal of the Office Assistant feature.

On April 2, 2011, Microsoft Office Labs released Ribbon Hero 2: Clippy's Second Chance, a free puzzle video game used to teach users the basics of Microsoft Office 2007 and 2010. In the game, Clippy is searching for a part-time job before discovering a time machine that takes him to different time periods. The player must complete multiple office related tasks to progress the story further.

Clippy, hidden

A small image of Clippy can be found in Microsoft Office 2013 and newer, which can be seen by going to Options and changing the theme (or Office Background) to "School Supplies". Clippy would then appear on the ribbon.

Clippy appeared as an Office Assistant in Office Online as part of an April Fools' Day 2014 joke. Several days later, an easter egg was found in the then-preview version of Windows Phone 8.1. When asked if she likes Clippy, the personal assistant Cortana would answer "Definitely. He taught me how important it is to listen." or "What's not to like? That guy took a heck of a beating and he's still smiling." Her avatar occasionally turned into a two-dimensional Metro-style Clippy for several seconds. This easter egg is still available in the full release version of the Windows Phone operating system and Windows 10.

On March 19, 2019, Microsoft released a "Clippy!" sticker pack for Microsoft Teams on the Microsoft 365 Developer GitHub Page, but was removed three days later. The sticker pack was later integrated into Teams itself on November 1, 2021, and has been included ever since. He is also present in some of the backgrounds users can select.

The paperclip emoji (📎) on Windows 11

In July 2021, Microsoft used Twitter to show off a redesign of Clippy, and said that if it received 20,000 likes they would replace the paperclip emoji on Microsoft 365 with the character. The Tweet quickly surpassed 20,000 likes and they then announced they would replace it. In November 2021, Microsoft officially updated their design of the paperclip emoji (📎) on Windows 11 to be Clippy.

== In popular culture ==
Clippy is the subject of numerous humorous parodies and references, including Internet memes. It has been lampooned in multiple television series, including Family Guy, The Simpsons, The Office, and Silicon Valley. Saturday Night Live's season 40 (2015) skit "The Office Assistant" featuring Bobby Moynihan as Pushy the Push Pin parodies Clippy.

Clippy was featured in the music video for "Weird Al" Yankovic's song "Word Crimes".

On April 1, 2015, social media website Tumblr created a parody of Clippy, Coppy, as an April Fools joke. Coppy is an anthropomorphized photocopier that behaved in similar ways to Clippy, asking the user if they want help. Coppy would engage the reader in a series of pointless questions, with a dialogue box written in Comic Sans MS, which was deliberately designed to be extremely annoying.

In a June 2008 episode of the NPR show Wait Wait... Don't Tell Me! marking the occasion of Bill Gates transitioning to semi-retirement from Microsoft, humorist Adam Felber and comedian Paul Provenza ad-lib a scenario in which Clippy is being driven to a location outside of Redmond, Washington, at night and says such things as "It looks like you're digging a grave. Is this a business grave or a personal grave?" The segment has become one of the most requested by listeners for replay during "best of" reviews of the show.

In the 2021 video game, Halo Infinite, Clippy appears as an equippable weapon charm.

In August 2025, Clippy became the symbol of an anti-consumerism trend after YouTuber and activist Louis Rossmann uploaded a video titled "Change your profile picture to clippy. I'm serious", with him encouraging viewers to switch their profile pictures to Clippy to protest unfair business practices and data harvesting from users by companies to train artificial intelligence models.

In Japan, the Assistant feature is remembered by a viral screenshot of a user subjecting the dolphin Kairu to the query "How to get rid of you".

== See also ==
- BonziBuddy
- Cortana (virtual assistant)
- Microsoft Agent
- Microsoft Bob
- Microsoft Copilot
- Microsoft Office
- Talking Moose
- Virtual assistant
