= Narrator (Windows) =

Screen reader for Microsoft Windows

- Screenshot of Narrator in Windows 11 in Light Mode
- Developer: Microsoft
- Initial release: February 17, 2000; 26 years ago
- Operating system: Windows 2000 and later
- Platform: IA-32, x86-64, ARM64
- Type: Screen reader
- License: Proprietary commercial software

Narrator is a screen reader in Microsoft Windows. Developed by Professor Paul Blenkhorn in 2000, the utility made the Windows operating system more accessible for blind and visually impaired users.

== Overview ==
Narrator is included with every copy of Microsoft Windows, providing a measure of access to Windows without the need to install additional software as long as the computer in use includes a sound card and speakers or headphones. Windows 2000 was the first Microsoft operating system released with some degree of accessibility for the blind built in, permitting a blind person to walk up to any such computer and make some use of it immediately.

The Windows 2000 version of Narrator uses SAPI 4 and allows the use of other SAPI 4 voices. The Windows XP version uses the newer SAPI 5. However, it only allows the use of the default voice, Microsoft Sam, even if other voices have been installed.

In Windows Vista and Windows 7, Narrator has been updated to use SAPI 5.3 and the Microsoft Anna voice for English. In Windows Ultimate and Windows editions for China, the Microsoft Lili voice for Mandarin Chinese is included.

In Windows 10, Narrator is available in English (United States, United Kingdom, and India), French, Italian, German, Japanese, Korean, Mandarin (Chinese Simplified and Chinese Traditional), Cantonese (Chinese Traditional), Spanish (Spain and Mexico), Polish, Russian, and Portuguese (Brazil).

A version of Narrator is also included in all Windows Phones, though with far fewer settings than the Narrator for the desktop. Narrator for Windows Phones previously only worked if the phone's language is set to "English (United States)".

There are numerous voices included in the narrator pack, such as Microsoft David, Microsoft Zira, Microsoft Mark, and in earlier editions, Microsoft Hazel.

In Windows 11, the Narrator app was redesigned and new natural voices were added. The app is available in both Dark and Contrast Themes.

== See also ==
- VoiceOver
