= Microsoft Voice Command =

Discontinued virtual assistant by Microsoft

Microsoft Voice Command is an application which can control Windows Mobile devices by voice. The first version was announced in November 2003 and it was supported in the United Kingdom, United States, France, and Germany.

Windows Mobile 6.5 had Microsoft TellMe integration, software created by a company Microsoft had recently acquired. This feature was later implemented in Windows Phone as a part of Bing Mobile.

== See also ==
- Speech recognition
- Speech synthesis
- Voice control
- Microsoft Cortana
