= Microsoft Speech Server =

The Microsoft Speech Server is a product from Microsoft designed to allow the authoring and deployment of IVR applications incorporating Speech Recognition, Speech Synthesis and DTMF.

== History ==
The first version of the server was released in 2004 as Microsoft Speech Server 2004 and supported applications developed for U.S. English-speaking users. A later release (Speech Server 2004 R2) was released in 2005 and added support for North American Spanish and Canadian French as well as additional features and fixes.

In August 2006, Microsoft announced that Speech Server 2007, originally slated to be released in May 2007, had been merged with the Microsoft Office Live Communications Server product line to create Microsoft Office Communications Server.

The Speech Server 2007 components of Office Communications Server are also available separately in the free Speech Server 2007 Developers Edition.

=== Later development ===
Microsoft announced in 2006 that the speech capabilities developed for Speech Server 2007 would be incorporated into Microsoft Office Communications Server 2007. Office Communications Server 2007 subsequently included speech application capabilities for developing speech-enabled interactive voice response applications. The original Speech Server product is no longer a current Microsoft product. Microsoft subsequently provided speech-development technologies through the Microsoft Speech Platform and, later, the Azure AI Speech service and Speech SDK.

== See also ==
- Microsoft Office Communications Server
- Speech Recognition
- Speech Synthesis
- Interactive voice response
