= Microsoft Office 2003 =

Office suite by Microsoft

- Microsoft Office 2003 applications from top right: Word, Excel, Outlook and PowerPoint which collectively make up the Standard edition.
- Developer: Microsoft
- Release: August 19, 2003; 23 years ago
- Final release: Service Pack 3 (11.0.8173.0) / September 17, 2007; 18 years ago
- Operating system: Windows 2000 SP3 or later
- Platform: IA-32
- Predecessor: Microsoft Office XP (2001)
- Successor: Microsoft Office 2007 (2007)
- Type: Office suite
- License: Trialware and software as a service (Microsoft Software Assurance)
- Website: Microsoft Office 2003 (Archived at Wayback Machine)

Microsoft Office 2003 (codenamed Office 11) is an office suite developed and distributed by Microsoft for its Windows operating system. Office 2003 was released to manufacturing on August 19, 2003, and was later released to retail on October 21, 2003. The Mac OS X equivalent, Microsoft Office 2004 for Mac was released on May 11, 2004.

New features in Office 2003 include information rights management; new collaboration features; improved support for SharePoint, smart tags, and XML; and extended use of Office Online services. Office 2003 introduces two new programs to the Office product lineup: InfoPath, a program for designing, filling, and submitting electronic structured data forms; and OneNote, a note-taking program for creating and organizing diagrams, graphics, handwritten notes, recorded audio, and text. It also introduces the Picture Manager graphics software to open, manage, and share digital images.

With the release of Office 2003, Microsoft rebranded the Office productivity suite as an integrated system dedicated to information workers. As a result, Microsoft appended the "Office" branding to the names of all programs. Office 2003 is also the first version with support for themes and visual styles, and introduces updated icons. The Office logo was also updated, eliminating the puzzle motif in use since Office 95. Office 2003 is the last version of Office to include the traditional menu bar and toolbar interface across all programs, and also the last version to include the "97 - 2003" file format as the default file format.

Office 2003 is compatible with Windows 2000 SP3 through Windows 7 and Windows Server 2008 R2. It is the last version of Microsoft Office to run on Windows 2000 SP3+, Windows XP RTM through SP1 and Windows Server 2003 RTM. Office 2003 does not support Windows 9x operating systems.

Microsoft released a total of three service packs for Office 2003 throughout its lifecycle. Service Pack 1 was released on July 27, 2004, and Service Pack 2 was released on September 27, 2005. Support for Office 2003 ended on April 8, 2014, along with Windows XP.

== New features ==
The core applications, Word, Excel, PowerPoint, and Access, had only minor improvements from Office XP. Outlook 2003 received improved functionality in many areas, including better email and calendar sharing and information display, complete Unicode support, search folders, colored flags, Kerberos authentication, RPC over HTTP, and Cached Exchange mode. Another key benefit of Outlook 2003 was the improved junk mail filter. Tablet and pen support was introduced in the productivity applications. Word 2003 introduced a reading layout view, document comparison, better change-tracking and annotation/reviewing, a Research Task Pane, voice comments and an XML-based format among other features. Excel 2003 introduced list commands, some statistical functions and XML data import, analysis and transformation/document customization features. Access 2003 introduced a backup command, the ability to view object dependencies, error checking in forms and reports among other features.

Office 2003 features improvements to smart tags such as smart tag Lists, which are defined in XML, by using regular expressions and an extended type library. Smart tag recognition was added to PowerPoint and Access. FrontPage 2003 introduced conditional formatting, Find and Replace for HTML elements, new tools for creating and formatting tables and cells, dynamic templates (Dreamweaver), Flash support, WebDAV and SharePoint publishing among other features. Publisher 2003 introduced a Generic Color PostScript printer driver for commercial printing. Information Rights Management capabilities were introduced in document productivity applications to limit access to a set of users and/or restrict types of actions that users could perform. Support for managed code add-ins as VSTO solutions was introduced.

Office 2003 was the last version of Microsoft Office to include fully customizable toolbars and menus for all of its applications, the Office Assistant, the ability to slipstream service packs into the original setup files, Office Web Components, and the Save My Settings Wizard, which allowed users to choose whether to keep a locally cached copy of installation source files and several utility resource kit tools. A new picture organizer with basic editing features, called Microsoft Office Picture Manager, was included.

Only basic clipart and templates were included on the disc media, with most content hosted online and downloadable from within the Office application. Microsoft advertised Office Online as a major Office 2003 feature "outside the box". Office Online provides how-to articles, tips, training courses, templates, clip art, stock photos and media and downloads (including Microsoft and third-party extensibility add-ins for Microsoft Office programs).

Office 2003 features broad XML integration (designing customized XML schemas, importing and transforming XML data) throughout resulting in a far more data-centric model (instead of a document-based one). The MSXML 5 library was introduced specifically for Office's XML integration. Office 2003 also has SharePoint integration to facilitate data exchange, collaborated workflow, and publishing. InfoPath 2003 was introduced for collecting data in XML-based forms and templates based on information from databases.

== Removed features ==
- Design Time Controls are no longer supported in FrontPage 2003.
- The Access 2.0 database conversion utility is removed from the installation CD and the Client Server Visual Design Tools for Access are no longer included.
- A large number of converters and filters are no longer available on the installation CD. Several international font options are also removed.
- Genigraphics Wizard support and Presentation Broadcasting were removed in PowerPoint 2003. A download for the latter was made available by Microsoft.
- Microsoft Draw Converter and Organization Chart Converter are no longer available.
- The Web Pages wizard is no longer available in Word 2003.
- In Word 2003, the Comments option on the View menu as well as the button on the Comment pane to close the pane were removed.
- Microsoft Photo Editor was removed, including many features not available in its replacement, Microsoft Office Picture Manager.
- Due to the deprecation of WinHelp, context-sensitive help was removed in Office 2003.
- Microsoft Office Shortcut Bar was removed.

== Editions ==
Microsoft released five separate editions of Office 2003: Basic, Student and Teacher, Standard, Small Business, and Professional. Retail editions were available in Full or Upgrade versions. The Basic edition was only available to original equipment manufacturers. The Student and Teacher edition was intended for noncommercial use only. All Office 2003 applications were available for purchase as standalone products.

Comparison of Microsoft Office 2003 editions
Application	Basic	Student and Teacher	Standard	Small Business	Professional
Word	Yes	Yes	Yes	Yes	Yes
Excel	Yes	Yes	Yes	Yes	Yes
Outlook	Yes	Yes	Yes	Yes with Business Contact Manager	Yes with Business Contact Manager
PowerPoint	No	Yes	Yes	Yes	Yes
Visio	No	No	No	No	No
Project	No	No	No	No	No
Publisher	No	No	No	Yes	Yes
Access	No	No	No	No	Yes
FrontPage	No	No	No	No	No
OneNote	No	No	No	No	No
InfoPath	No	No	No	No	Yes; Volume licensed "Professional Enterprise" edition only

== System requirements ==
Office 2003 system requirements
Requirement	Minimum	Recommended
Microsoft Windows
Operating system	Windows 2000 SP3 or later (InfoPath requires Internet Explorer 6 or later)	
CPU	Intel Pentium 233 MHz; Intel Pentium II 400 MHz required for speech recognition 450 MHz processor required for Business Contact Manager for Outlook	Intel Pentium III
Memory	128 MB; 256 MB is required for Business Contact Manager for Outlook	
Free space	210 MB (Student and Teacher, Standard); 380 MB (Small Business); 400 MB (Professional); An additional 190 MB of free space is required to install Business Contact Manager	Cached installation files require the following additional hard disk space: 250 MB (Student and Teacher); 260 MB (Standard); 280 MB (Small Business); 290 MB (Professional)
Media	A CD-ROM drive is required to install Office 2003 from optical media	
Graphics hardware	800×600 (SVGA) with 256 colors	
Sound hardware	An audio output device and microphone are required for speech recognition	
Network	Certain advanced collaboration features require Exchange Server; Internet access is required for product activation and online functionality	
Input device(s)	Mouse and keyboard	Stylus and touchscreen for certain inking functionality

== See also ==
- Comparison of office suites
- History of Microsoft Office
- List of Microsoft Office programs
- List of office suites
- Windows Speech Recognition
