= DingDong =

Smart speaker from LingLong

DingDong is a line of smart speakers created by Chinese company Ling Long (a partnership between JD.com and iFlytek). The metal A1 was released in 2016, followed by the release of the cheaper A3 and Q1 the following year. The A1 has a height of 9.5 inches (24 centimeters) and has a square base which transitions to a cylinder at the top. The devices are capable of reading the news, music streaming, weather updates, and online shopping. Versions are available that speak either Mandarin or Cantonese.
