= Digital television =

Television transmission using digital encoding

A map depicting digital terrestrial television standards

Digital television (DTV) is the transmission of television signals using digital encoding, in contrast to the earlier analog television technology which used analog signals. In the 2000s it was represented as the first major evolution in television technology since color television in the 1950s. Modern digital television is transmitted in high-definition television (HDTV) formats with greater resolution than analog TV. It typically uses a widescreen aspect ratio (commonly 16:9) in contrast to the narrower format (4:3) of analog TV. It makes more economical use of scarce radio spectrum space; it can transmit numerous digital channels in the same bandwidth as a single analog channel, and provides many new features that analog television cannot. While digital satellite and cable TV deployments began in the 1990s, using standard definition television resolutions (digital SDTV), over-the-air digital TV began transitioning from analog to digital broadcasting in the late 1990s, primarily using high definition television formats (digital HDTV). Different digital television broadcasting standards have been adopted in different parts of the world; below are the more widely used standards:

- Digital Video Broadcasting (DVB) uses coded orthogonal frequency-division multiplexing (OFDM) modulation and supports hierarchical transmission. This standard has been adopted in Europe, Africa, Asia and Australasia, for a total of approximately 60 countries.
- Advanced Television System Committee (ATSC) standard uses eight-level vestigial sideband (8VSB) for terrestrial broadcasting. This standard has been adopted by 9 countries: the United States, Canada, Mexico, South Korea, the Bahamas, Jamaica, the Dominican Republic, Haiti and Suriname.
- Integrated Services Digital Broadcasting (ISDB) is a system designed to provide good reception to fixed receivers and also portable or mobile receivers utilizing OFDM and two-dimensional interleaving. It supports hierarchical transmission of up to three layers and uses MPEG-2 video and Advanced Audio Coding. This standard has been adopted in Japan and the Philippines. ISDB-T International is an adaptation of this standard using H.264/MPEG-4 AVC, which has been adopted in most of South America as well as Botswana and Angola. 1seg (1-segment) is a special form of ISDB. Each channel is further divided into 13 segments. Twelve are allocated for HDTV and the other for narrow-band receivers such as mobile televisions and cell phones.
- Digital Terrestrial Multimedia Broadcast (DTMB) adopts time-domain synchronous (TDS) OFDM technology with a pseudo-random signal frame to serve as the guard interval (GI) of the OFDM block and the training symbol. The DTMB standard has been adopted in China, including Hong Kong and Macau.
- Digital Multimedia Broadcasting (DMB) is a digital radio transmission technology developed and adopted in South Korea as part of the national information technology project for sending multimedia such as TV, radio and datacasting to mobile devices such as mobile phones, laptops and GPS navigation systems.

With the advent of the broadband Internet in the late 1990s, facilitated by high-speed cable modems and Digital Subscriber Line (DSL) modems, it became possible to stream entertainment-quality video to broadband Internet subscribers. By the late 2000s, broadband Internet speeds were sufficiently high to enable HD-quality video to consumers, allowing Internet Protocol (IP) video to become more competitive with traditional digital TV services. Many Internet content companies emerged, providing expanding libraries of on-demand content. Typically, these Internet TV streaming apps are received directly by "smart" HDTV sets through a program guide and Wi-Fi, or through Wi-Fi-enabled streaming boxes or streaming USB sticks connected to the HDTV set. Many of the same streaming apps are available to other IP-capable devices inside and outside the home, such as smartphones, tablets, and laptops.

== History ==
=== Background ===
Digital television's roots in the 1990s were tied to the availability of high-performance computers containing video coding algorithms that could compress video. Digital television was previously impractical due to high bandwidth requirements of uncompressed video, requiring around 200 Mbit/s for a standard-definition television (SDTV) signal, and over 1 Gbit/s for high-definition television (HDTV).

=== Development ===
In the mid-1980s, Toshiba commercially released one of the first television sets with digital capabilities, using integrated circuit chips such as a microprocessor to convert analog television broadcast signals to digital video signals, enabling features such as freezing pictures and showing two channels at once. Following in 1986, Sony and NEC Home Electronics announced their own similar TV sets with digital video capabilities. However, these television sets still relied on analog TV broadcast signals, with true digital TV broadcasts not yet being available at the time.

A digital TV broadcast service was proposed in 1986 by Nippon Telegraph and Telephone (NTT) and the Ministry of Posts and Telecommunications (MPT) in Japan, where there were plans to develop an "Integrated Network System" service. However, practical digital TV service implementation was not available until the adoption of motion-compensated DCT video compression formats such as MPEG made it possible in the early 1990s.

In the mid-1980s, as Japanese consumer electronics firms forged ahead with the development of HDTV technology, the MUSE analog format was proposed by Japan's public broadcaster NHK as a worldwide standard. Until June 1990, the Japanese MUSE standard—based on an analog system—was the front-runner, set to eclipse US electronics company solutions, among the more than 23 different technical concepts under consideration.

In Europe, through the leadership of French President François Mitterrand and German Chancellor Helmut Kohl, government bodies were subsidizing the development of HD-MAC, Europe's analog HDTV response to Japan's MUSE technology.

Simultaneously, between 1988 and 1991, European organizations: CMMT, ETSI, etc. were working on DCT-based digital video coding standards for both SDTV and HDTV. The EU 256 project by the CMTT and ETSI, along with research by Italian broadcaster RAI, developed a DCT video codec that broadcast SDTV at 34 Mbit/s and near-studio-quality HDTV at about 70–140 Mbit/s. RAI demonstrated this with a 1990 FIFA World Cup broadcast in June 1990.

In 1987, the FCC had begun considering potential new systems for HDTV. After the feasibility of a digital system became clear in 1990, the FCC began to take action. First, the FCC declared that the new TV standard must be more than an enhanced analog signal, capable of providing a genuine HDTV signal with at least twice the resolution of existing television images. Second, to ensure that viewers who did not wish to buy a new digital television set could continue to receive conventional television broadcasts, it dictated that the new ATV standard must be capable of being simulcast with NTSC on different channels. The new ATV standard also allowed the new DTV signal to be based on entirely new design principles, incorporating many improvements over existing analog television. Third, various companies already involved in the FCC's advanced television standard activity began changing their approaches from analog HDTV to digital HDTV.

A universal standard for scanning formats, aspect ratios, or lines of resolution was not produced by the FCC's final standard. This outcome resulted from a dispute between the consumer electronics industry (joined by some broadcasters) and the computer industry (joined by the film industry and some public interest groups) over which of the two scanning processes—interlaced or progressive—is superior. Interlaced scanning, which is used by the electronics industry in televisions worldwide, scans even-numbered lines first, then odd-numbered ones. Progressive scanning, which is the format used in computers, scans lines in sequence, from top to bottom. The computer industry argued that progressive scanning is superior because it does not flicker in the manner of interlaced scanning. It also argued that progressive scanning enables easier connections with the Internet and is more cheaply converted to interlaced formats than vice versa. The film industry also supported progressive scanning because it offers a more efficient means of converting filmed programming into digital formats. The consumer electronics industry and broadcasters argued that interlaced scanning was the only technology that could transmit the highest quality pictures then (and currently) feasible, i.e., 1,080 lines per picture and 1,920 pixels per line. Broadcasters also favored interlaced scanning because their vast archive of interlaced programming is not readily compatible with a progressive format.

=== Inaugural launches ===
DirecTV in the US launched the first commercial digital satellite platform in May 1994, using the Digital Satellite System (DSS) standard. Digital cable broadcasts were tested and launched in the US in 1996 by TCI and Time Warner. The first digital terrestrial platform was launched in November 1998 as ONdigital in the UK, using the DVB-T standard.

== Technical information ==
=== Formats and bandwidth ===
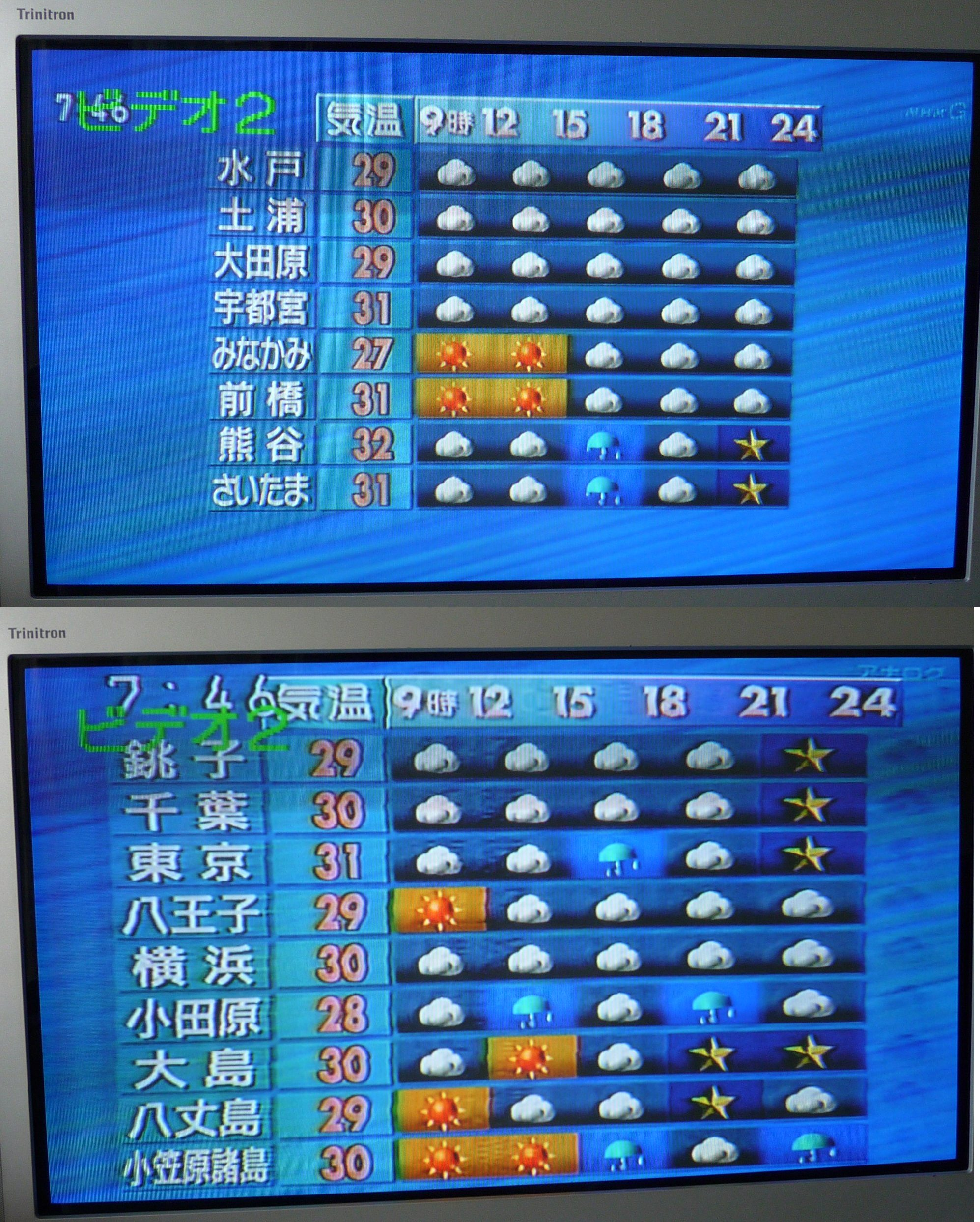
Comparison of image quality between ISDB-T (1080i broadcast, top) and NTSC (480i transmission, bottom)

Digital television supports many different picture formats defined by the broadcast television systems, which are a combination of size and aspect ratio (width-to-height ratio).

With digital terrestrial television (DTT) broadcasting, the range of formats can be broadly divided into two categories: high-definition television (HDTV) for the transmission of high-definition video and standard-definition television (SDTV). These terms by themselves are not very precise and many subtle intermediate cases exist.

One of several different HDTV formats that can be transmitted over DTV is: 1280 × 720 pixels in progressive scan mode (abbreviated 720p) or 1920 × 1080 pixels in interlaced video mode (1080i). Each of these uses a 16:9 aspect ratio. Uncompressed HDTV cannot be transmitted over analog television channels because of channel capacity issues.

SDTV, by comparison, may use one of several different formats taking the form of various aspect ratios depending on the technology used in the country of broadcast. NTSC can deliver a 640 × 480 resolution in 4:3 and 854 × 480 in 16:9, while PAL can give 768 × 576 in 4:3 and 1024 × 576 in 16:9. However, broadcasters may choose to reduce these resolutions to reduce bit rate (e.g., many DVB-T channels in the UK use a horizontal resolution of 544 or 704 pixels per line).

Each commercial broadcasting terrestrial television DTV channel in North America is allocated enough bandwidth to broadcast up to 19 megabits per second using 8VSB modulation. However, the broadcaster does not need to use this entire bandwidth for just one broadcast channel. Instead, the broadcast can use Program and System Information Protocol and subdivide across several video subchannels (a.k.a. feeds) of varying quality and compression rates, including non-video datacasting services.

A broadcaster may opt to use a standard-definition (SDTV) digital signal instead of an HDTV signal, because current convention allows the bandwidth of a DTV channel (or "multiplex") to be subdivided into multiple digital subchannels, (similar to what most FM radio stations offer with HD Radio), providing multiple feeds of entirely different television programming on the same channel. This ability to provide either a single HDTV feed or multiple lower-resolution feeds is often referred to as distributing one's bit budget or multicasting. This can sometimes be arranged automatically, using a statistical multiplexer. With some implementations, image resolution may be less directly limited by bandwidth; for example, in DVB-T, broadcasters can choose from several different modulation schemes, giving them the option to reduce the transmission bit rate and possibly improve reception for more distant or mobile viewers.

=== Reception ===
There are several different ways to receive digital television. One of the oldest means of receiving DTV (and TV in general) is from terrestrial transmitters using an antenna (known as an aerial in some countries). This delivery method is known as digital terrestrial television (DTT). With DTT, viewers are limited to channels that have a terrestrial transmitter within range of their antenna.

Other delivery methods include digital cable and digital satellite. In some countries where transmissions of TV signals are normally achieved by microwaves, digital multichannel multipoint distribution service is used. Other standards, such as digital multimedia broadcasting (DMB) and digital video broadcasting - handheld (DVB-H), have been devised to allow handheld devices such as mobile phones to receive TV signals. Another way is Internet Protocol television (IPTV), which is the delivery of TV over a computer network. Finally, an alternative way is to receive digital TV signals via the open Internet (Internet television), whether from a central streaming service or a P2P (peer-to-peer) system.

Some television signals are protected by encryption and backed up with the force of law under the WIPO Copyright Treaty and national legislation implementing it, such as the US Digital Millennium Copyright Act. Access to encrypted channels can be controlled by a removable card, for example via the Common Interface or CableCard.

=== Protection parameters ===
Digital television signals should not interfere with each other and many times coexist with analog television until it is phased out. The following table gives allowable signal-to-noise and signal-to-interference ratios for various interference scenarios. This table is a crucial regulatory tool for controlling the placement and power levels of digital television stations. Digital TV is more tolerant of interference than analog TV.

System Parameters (protection ratios)	Canada	US	EBU ITU-mode M3	Japan & Brazil (Note: ISDB-T (6 MHz, 64QAM, R=2/3), Analog TV (M/NTSC).)
C/N for AWGN Channel	+19.5 dB (16.5 dB (Note: The Canadian parameter, C/(N+I) of noise plus co-channel DTV interface should be 16.5 dB.))	+15.19 dB	+19.3 dB	+19.2 dB
Co-Channel DTV into Analog TV	+33.8 dB	+34.44 dB	+34 ≈37 dB	+38 dB
Co-Channel Analog TV into DTV	+7.2 dB	+1.81 dB	+4 dB	+4 dB
Co-Channel DTV into DTV	+19.5 dB (16.5 dB)	+15.27 dB	+19 dB	+19 dB
Lower Adjacent Channel DTV into Analog TV	−16 dB	−17.43 dB	−5 ~ −11 dB (Note: Depending on analog TV systems used.)	−6 dB
Upper Adjacent Channel DTV into Analog TV	−12 dB	−11.95 dB	−1 ~ −10	−5 dB
Lower Adjacent Channel Analog TV into DTV	−48 dB	−47.33 dB	−34 ~ −37 dB	−35 dB
Upper Adjacent Channel Analog TV into DTV	−49 dB	−48.71 dB	−38 ~ −36 dB	−37 dB
Lower Adjacent Channel DTV into DTV	−27 dB	−28 dB	−30 dB	−28 dB
Upper Adjacent Channel DTV into DTV	−27 dB	−26 dB	−30 dB	−29 dB

=== Interaction ===
Viewers can interact and provide data back to broadcasters with DTV systems in various ways shown in the list below. A return path to the broadcaster is possible in post-2020s DTV systems, typically via the viewer's internet connection. Some DTV systems support video on demand using a communication channel localized to a neighborhood rather than a city (terrestrial) or an even larger area (satellite)

1. Browse the electronic program guide.
2. Targeted advertising
3. Viewing statistics

== Comparison to analog ==
DTV has several advantages over analog television,

- More efficient bandwidth usage provides more digital channels in the same space or provides high-definition television service
- Digital TV signals require less transmission power than analog TV signals to be broadcast and received satisfactorily.
- Flexible bandwidth allocations are flexible depending on the level of compression and resolution of the transmitted image.
- More sound channels. Analog TV began with monophonic sound and later developed multichannel television sound with two independent audio signal channels. DTV allows up to 5 audio signal channels plus a subwoofer bass channel, producing broadcasts similar in quality to movie theaters and DVDs.
- Can provide for sale of non-television services such as multimedia on demand or interactive purchasing.
- Permits special services such as multiplexing (more than one program on the same channel), electronic program guides and additional languages (spoken or subtitled).

Digital and analog signals react to interference differently. For example, common problems with analog television include ghosting of images, noise from weak signals and other problems that degrade the quality of the image and sound, although the program material may still be watchable. With digital television, because of the cliff effect, reception of the digital signal must be very nearly complete; otherwise, neither audio nor video will be usable.

=== Compression artifacts, picture quality monitoring and allocated bandwidth ===
DTV images have some picture defects not present on analog television or motion picture cinema, because of present-day limitations of bit rate and compression algorithms such as MPEG-2. This defect is sometimes referred to as mosquito noise.

Because of the way the human visual system works, defects in an image that are localized to particular features of the image or that come and go are more perceptible than defects that are uniform and constant. However, the DTV system is designed to take advantage of other limitations of the human visual system to help mask these flaws, e.g., by allowing more compression artifacts during fast motion where the eye cannot track and resolve them as easily and, conversely, minimizing artifacts in still backgrounds that, because time allows, may be closely examined in a scene.

Broadcast, cable, satellite and Internet DTV operators control the picture quality of television signal encoders using sophisticated, neuroscience-based algorithms, such as the structural similarity index measure (SSIM) video quality measurement tool. Another tool called visual information fidelity (VIF) is used in the Netflix VMAF video quality monitoring system.

Quantising effects can create contours—rather than smooth gradations—on areas with small graduations in amplitude. Typically, a very flat scene, such as a cloudless sky, will exhibit visible steps across its expanse, often appearing as concentric circles or ellipses. This is known as color banding. Similar effects can be seen in very dark scenes, where true black backgrounds are overlaid by dark gray areas. These transitions may be smooth, or may show a scattering effect as the digital processing dithers and is unable to consistently allocate a value of either absolute black or the next step up the greyscale.

=== Effects of poor reception ===
Changes in signal reception from factors such as degrading antenna connections or changing weather conditions may gradually reduce the quality of analog TV. The nature of digital TV results in a perfectly decodable video initially, until the receiving equipment starts picking up interference that overpowers the desired signal or if the signal is too weak to decode. Some equipment will show a garbled picture with significant damage, while other devices may go directly from perfectly decodable video to no video at all or lock up. This phenomenon is known as the digital cliff effect.

Block errors may occur when transmission is done with compressed images. A block error in a single frame often results in black boxes in several subsequent frames, making viewing difficult.

For remote locations, distant channels that, as analog signals, were previously usable in a snowy and degraded state may, as digital signals, be perfectly decodable or may become completely unavailable. The use of higher frequencies adds to these problems, especially in cases where a clear line-of-sight from the receiving antenna to the transmitter is not available because usually higher frequency signals can't pass through obstacles as easily.

=== Effect on old analog technology ===
Television sets with only analog tuners cannot decode digital transmissions. When analog broadcasting over the air ceases, users of sets with analog-only tuners may use other sources of programming (e.g., cable, recorded media) or may purchase set-top converter boxes to tune in the digital signals. In the United States, a government-sponsored coupon was available to offset the cost of an external converter box.

The digital television transition began around the late 1990s and has been completed on a country-by-country basis in most parts of the world.

=== Disappearance of TV-audio receivers ===
Prior to the conversion to digital TV, analog television broadcast audio for TV channels on a separate FM carrier signal from the video signal. This FM audio signal could be heard using standard radios equipped with the appropriate tuning circuits.

However, after the digital television transition, no portable radio manufacturer has yet developed an alternative method for portable radios to play just the audio signal of digital TV channels; DTV radio is not the same thing.

=== Environmental issues ===
The adoption of a broadcast standard incompatible with existing analog receivers has created the problem of large numbers of analog receivers being discarded. One superintendent of public works was quoted in 2009 saying, "Some of the studies I’ve read in the trade magazines say up to a quarter of American households could be throwing a TV out in the next two years following the regulation change." In Michigan in 2009, one recycler estimated that as many as one household in four would dispose of or recycle a TV set in the following year. The digital television transition, migration to high-definition television receivers and the replacement of CRTs with flat screens are all factors in the increasing number of discarded analog CRT-based television receivers. In 2009, an estimated 99 million analog TV receivers were sitting unused in homes in the US alone and, while some obsolete receivers are being retrofitted with converters, many more are simply dumped in landfills where they represent a source of toxic metals such as lead as well as lesser amounts of materials such as barium, cadmium and chromium.

== See also ==
- Autoroll
- Digital television in the United Kingdom
- Digital television in the United States
- Text to speech in digital television
