= Euphonia (device) =

Musical instrument

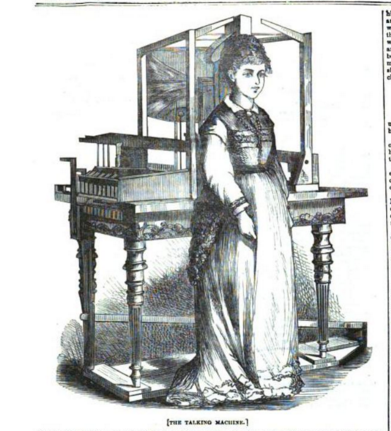
The Euphonia (The London Journal, 1870)

The Euphonia was a talking machine created in the early to mid-nineteenth century by the Austrian inventor Joseph Faber and exhibited in 1845 in Philadelphia and in 1846 in London's Egyptian Hall. An earlier version of the invention had been destroyed in 1844 by Faber.

== Construction ==
A mechanical device that he had reportedly spent over twenty-five years developing, Faber's "Fabulous Talking Machine" was constructed of several different mechanisms and instruments: a piano, a bellows, and a mechanical replica of the human throat and vocal organs. By pressing the keys on the keyboard, a human operator produced sounds that inflated the bellows and caused the mechanical mouth to open, the mechanical tongue to be lifted, and the mechanical jaws to move. Able to produce sentences in English, French, and German, the Euphonia was reported by The London Journal to speak all three with a German accent, a fact attributed to the native language (German) of the inventor. It was P.T. Barnum who renamed the talking machine "Euphonia", which was a striking, if probably coincidental, token of its ideological resemblance to Hector Berlioz' utopia, which bore the same name.

The Euphonia was not a novel contraption since it was similar to other automatons invented, particularly those that followed the general mechanics of serial assembly and the specific method of decomposing and reconstituting language through mechanized "scansion". A related technology was John Clark's The Eureka machine, which was invented a year prior to Euphonia's debut. It was, however, designed with a different function, which was to produce hexameters instead of sound.

== Exhibition ==
The Euphonia was exhibited with a female mask covering the mechanical mouth, tongue, and jaw and at times with a dress hanging below the mask, the Euphonia would perform for audiences, pretending to respond to or mimic the words of the keyboard operator. During its appearance in London, the automaton was also presented as a man dressed like a Turk.

In describing the Euphonia, the 19th century American scientist Joseph Henry explained "that sixteen levers or keys 'like those of a piano' projected sixteen elementary sounds by which 'every word in all European languages can be distinctly produced.' A seventeenth key opened and closed the equivalent of the glottis, an aperture between the vocal cords. 'The plan of the machine is the same as that of the human organs of speech, the several parts being worked by strings and levers instead of tendons and muscles.' Another account by London theater manager John Hollingshead described the experience as both sad and depressing: "It wanted little imagination to make the very few visitors believe that the figure contained an imprisoned human - or half human - being, bound to speak slowly when tormented by the unseen power outside," and that "no one thought for a moment that they were being fooled by a second edition of the Invisible Girl fraud."

== See also ==
- Automaton
- History of the telephone
- Speech synthesis
