= Leachim =

Synthetic speech device

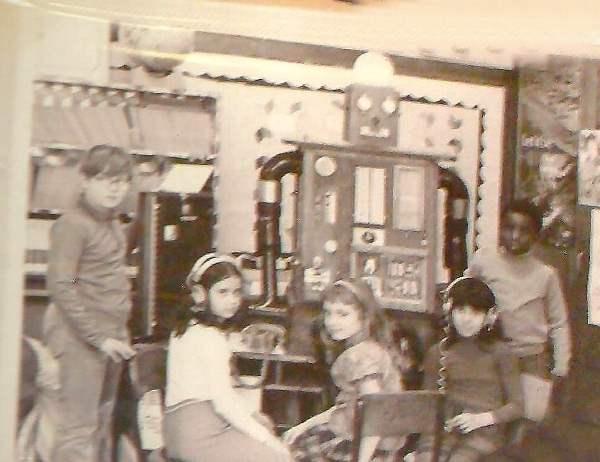
- Leachim with the 3rd grade students
- Inventor: Michael J. Freeman
- Purpose: Teaching

Leachim was an early example of Diphone synthetic speech and demonstrated how voice branching could be done quickly via computer discs to create understandable speech (i.e. verbal output). This method combined phonemes, words, and sentences to form verbal responsive messages when prompted by the computer. The device received world-wide attention, with hundreds of articles written about it.

== History ==
The device was developed by Michael J. Freeman and installed in robot form in a New York City School in a fourth grade class, as an assistant built for Michael's wife, the teacher Gail Freeman. It took 18 months and US$1,000 (equivalent to $7,950 in 2025) to design and build. The computer had biographical information of those students whom it was programmed to teach in addition to curriculum data.

Leachim remained active for three years from 1972 to 1975.

On June 12, 1975, Leachim was stolen while being trucked back to NY from a 1-hour appearance on The Phil Donahue Show. Despite an FBI investigation and a reward from Lloyd's of London, it was not recovered.

== Hardware ==
The computer part of the robot was built from RCA Spectra 70 series of computers. Leachim could simultaneously interact with multiple students and keep track of their progress individually. Its body was made of wood and there were internal mechanics so parts such as the arms and head could move.

== 2-XL ==
Later a toy-inspired version of Leachim called "2-XL Robot" was introduced. The toy was mass-produced in many countries by Mego Corporation in the 1980s and later by Tiger Electronics in the 1990s.
