= Chinese speech synthesis =

Application of speech synthesis to the Chinese language

Chinese speech synthesis is the application of speech synthesis to the Chinese language (usually Standard Chinese). It poses additional difficulties due to Chinese characters frequently having different pronunciations in different contexts and the complex prosody, which is essential to convey the meaning of words, and sometimes the difficulty in obtaining agreement among native speakers concerning what the correct pronunciation is of certain phonemes.

== Concatenation (Ekho and KeyTip) ==
Recordings can be concatenated in any desired combination, but the joins sound forced (as is usual for simple concatenation-based speech synthesis) and this can severely affect prosody; these synthesizers are also inflexible in terms of speed and expression. However, because these synthesizers do not rely on a corpus, there is no noticeable degradation in performance when they are given more unusual or awkward phrases.

Ekho is an open source TTS which simply concatenates sampled syllables. It currently supports Cantonese, Mandarin, and experimentally Korean. Some of the Mandarin syllables have been pitched-normalised in Praat. A modified version of these is used in Gradint's "synthesis from partials".

cjkware.com used to ship a product called KeyTip Putonghua Reader which worked similarly; it contained 120 Megabytes of sound recordings (GSM-compressed to 40 Megabytes in the evaluation version), comprising 10,000 multi-syllable dictionary words plus single-syllable recordings in 6 different prosodies (4 tones, neutral tone, and an extra third-tone recording for use at the end of a phrase).

== Lightweight synthesizers (eSpeak and Yuet) ==
The lightweight open-source speech project eSpeak, which has its own approach to synthesis, has experimented with Mandarin and Cantonese. eSpeak was used by Google Translate from May 2010 until December 2010.

The commercial product "Yuet" is also lightweight (it is intended to be suitable for resource-constrained environments like embedded systems); it was written from scratch in ANSI C starting from 2013. Yuet claims a built-in NLP model that does not require a separate dictionary; the speech synthesised by the engine claims clear word boundaries and emphasis on appropriate words. Communication with its author is required to obtain a copy.

Both eSpeak and Yuet can synthesis speech for Cantonese and Mandarin from the same input text, and can output the corresponding romanisation (for Cantonese, Yuet uses Yale and eSpeak uses Jyutping; both use Pinyin for Mandarin). eSpeak does not concern itself with word boundaries when these don't change the question of which syllable should be spoken.

== Corpus-based ==
A "corpus-based" approach can sound very natural in most cases but can err in dealing with unusual phrases if they can't be matched with the corpus. The synthesiser engine is typically very large (hundreds or even thousands of megabytes) due to the size of the corpus.

=== iFlyTek ===
Anhui USTC iFlyTek Co., Ltd (iFlyTek) published a W3C paper in which they adapted Speech Synthesis Markup Language to produce a mark-up language called Chinese Speech Synthesis Markup Language (CSSML) which can include additional markup to clarify the pronunciation of characters and to add some prosody information. The amount of data involved is not disclosed by iFlyTek but can be seen from the commercial products that iFlyTek have licensed their technology to; for example, Bider's SpeechPlus is a 1.3 Gigabyte download, 1.2 Gigabytes of which is used for the highly compressed data for a single Chinese voice. iFlyTek's synthesiser can also synthesise mixed Chinese and English text with the same voice (e.g. Chinese sentences containing some English words); they claim their English synthesis to be "average".

The iFlyTek corpus appears to be heavily dependent on Chinese characters, and it is not possible to synthesize from pinyin alone. It is sometimes possible by means of CSSML to add pinyin to the characters to disambiguate between multiple possible pronunciations, but this does not always work.

=== NeoSpeech ===
There is an online interactive demonstration for NeoSpeech speech synthesis, which accepts Chinese characters and also pinyin if it's enclosed in their proprietary "VTML" markup.

=== Mac OS ===
Mac OS had Chinese speech synthesizers available up to version 9. This was removed in 10.0 and reinstated in 10.7 (Lion).

=== Historical corpus-based synthesizers (no longer available) ===
A corpus-based approach was taken by Tsinghua University in SinoSonic, with the Harbin dialect voice data taking 800 Megabytes. This was planned to be offered as a download but the link was never activated. Nowadays, only references to it can be found on Internet Archive.

Bell Labs' approach, which was demonstrated online in 1997 but subsequently removed, was described in a monograph "Multilingual Text-to-Speech Synthesis: The Bell Labs Approach" (Springer, October 31, 1997, ISBN 978-0-7923-8027-6), and the former employee who was responsible for the project, Chilin Shih (who subsequently worked at the University of Illinois) put some notes about her methods on her website.
