= Icophone =

Speech synthesizer developed in 1964

The icophone is an instrument of speech synthesis conceived by Émile Leipp in 1964 and used for synthesizing the French language. The two first icophones were made in the laboratory of physical mechanics of Saint-Cyr-l'École.

The principle of the icophone is the representation of the sound by a spectrograph. The spectrogram analyzes a word, a phrase, or more generally a sound, and shows the distribution of the different frequencies with their relative intensities. The first machines to synthesize words were made by displaying the form of the spectrogram on a transparent tape, which controls a series of oscillators following the presence or absence of a black mark on the tape. Leipp succeeded in decomposing the segments of a spoken sound phenomenon, and in synthesizing them from a very simplified display.
