= Autoroll =

Autoroll (also Key Autoroll) refers to TV-signal decryption software that automatically updates a video receiver's or DVR/receiver's IDEA keys when the transmitting signal provider changes its block cipher algorithm.

Mention of autoroll software often figures in discussions of free-to-air satellite TV receivers, for which it is a vital component. Some form of autoroll software is also a standard component in pay-TV providers' smart cards, which allow subscription TV services to guard against signal piracy. However, the term is most prevalently used by illegal TV pirates who attempt to use free-to-air hardware to view pay-only programming.

Often TV pirates will hack a TV subscription-service provider's smart cards and reprogram them with an autoroll for all the subscription service's channels. Though providers like DIRECTV and DISH Network have attempted to use weekly ECMs, or "electronic countermeasures," to disrupt these illegal cards, many websites provide updated autoroll codes impervious to ECMs and offer this software for a monthly subscription fee less than the service provider's monthly fees.

Because subscription TV providers tend not to discuss the methods by which they encrypt and decrypt their signals, mention of "autoroll" software and "autorolling" on a website usually indicates that the website's owners are engaged in illegal TV piracy. Normally such sites claim they are not legally bound to reveal customers' identities; often enough too, such sites will claim their activities are completely legal. Yet according to both U.S. and Canadian laws neither claim is true. In fact, the U.S.'s Digital Millennium Copyright Act of 1998 compels equipment and coding providers to turn over their customers' records to subscription-service providers if the former is found to have engaged in or aided in stealing the latter's services.

== See also ==
- Television broadcasting
