= TVonics =

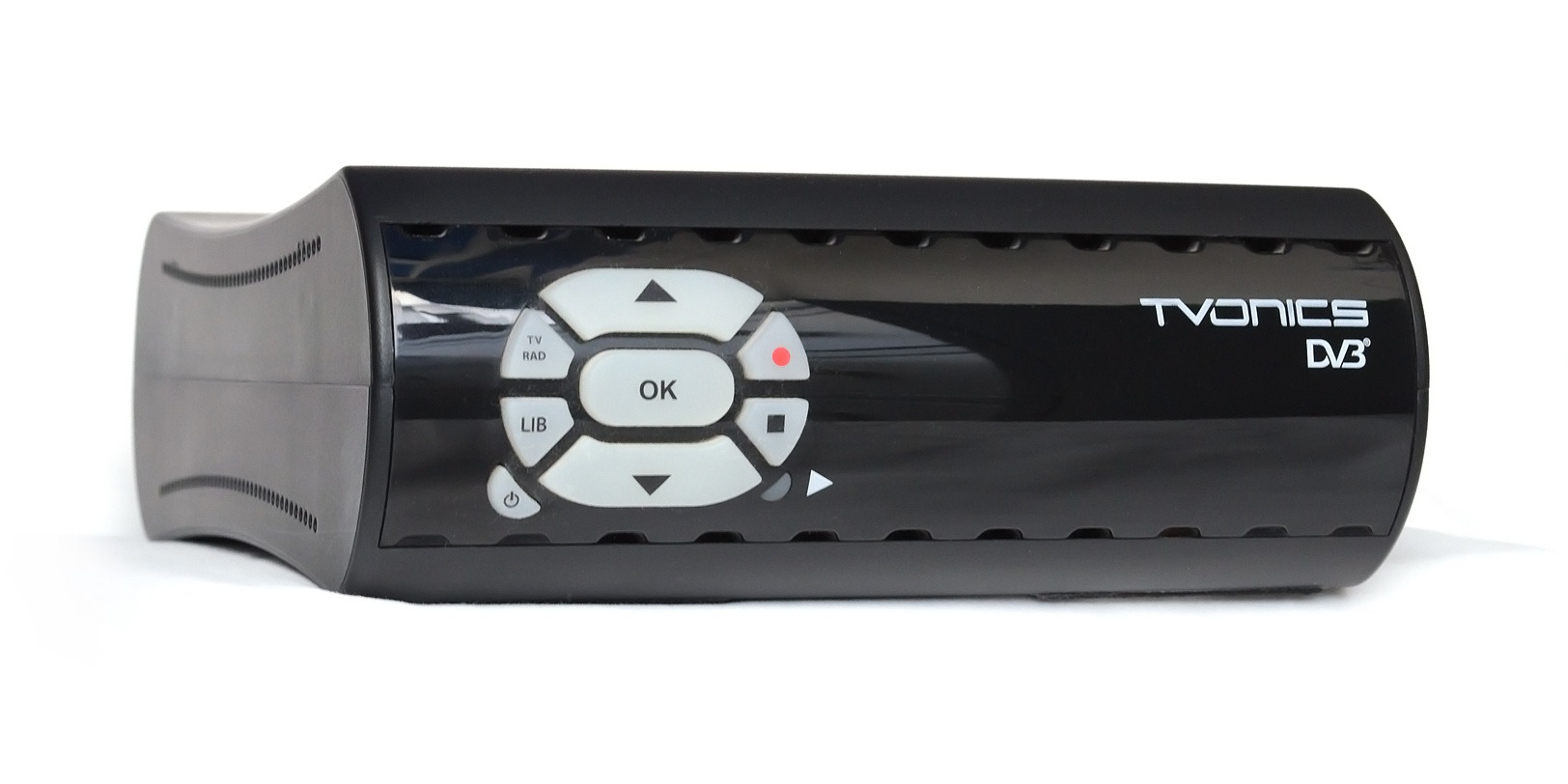
- TVonics DTR-FP2500 digital video recorder, circa 2008
- Product type: Consumer electronics
- Current owner: Pulse-Eight Limited
- Introduced: 2004
- Previous owners: TVonics Ltd; TVonics Solutions Ltd
- Tagline: Live life in HD
- Website: http://www.tvonics.com/

TVonics is an electronics brand focused on set top boxes and the UK Freeview market.

TVonics' original incarnation was as a company in its own right, formed in 2004. After entering administration for the second time in 2012, the TVonics brand and IP were acquired by Pulse-Eight Limited.

== History ==
=== Original incarnation ===
Founded in Wales in 2004 (as TVonics Ltd), the original TVonics company manufactured set-top boxes and digital video recorders. It was acquired in February 2008 by the Contact Holdings Group after the company went into administration and became TVonics Solutions Ltd.

TVonics was one of the few set-top box design houses that manufactured in the UK. The company initially entered the market with the PRISM set-top box under the TVonics and Ferguson brand. Several additional products were subsequently released under the TVonics brand including the MDR-200, DTR-Z250 and DTR-Z500.

TVonics was the original supplier of set-top boxes into the UK Government Digital Switchover Help Scheme, providing a custom designed product that met the requirements laid out by the scheme. This included support for Audio Description, a remodulator and the ability to perform automatic retuning, and a text-to-speech system created for visually impaired users.

In November 2007, TVonics was awarded the IET Start-up of the Year award.

=== 2012 bankruptcy and new ownership ===
On June 12, 2012, TVonics Solutions Limited went into administration, and Gary Bell of Bell Advisory Llp was appointed administrator to the company.

On October 22, 2012, it was reported that UK based Pulse-Eight had bought the TVonics brand and the technology behind TVonics DVRs, and announced a plan to create a next-generation of TVonics set-top box based on the popular open source media player software, XBMC, running on top of Android.

== Products ==
=== Prior to 2012 takeover ===
As of 4 August 2011, products made by TVonics included the following:-

Freeview+HD Recorder

- DTR-HD500
- DTR-Z500HD

Freeview+ Recorder

- DTR-HV250
- DTR-Z500AD
- DTR-Z500
- DTR-Z250
- DTR-HC250

Freeview Set top box

- MDR-240
- MDR-252
- MDR-251
- MDR-250
- MDR-100
- MFR-300
- MFR-200

== See also ==
- Pulse-Eight
- XBMC
- Freeview+
- Freeview HD
