= Pulse-Eight =

Consumer electronics manufacturer in the UK

Pulse-Eight Limited
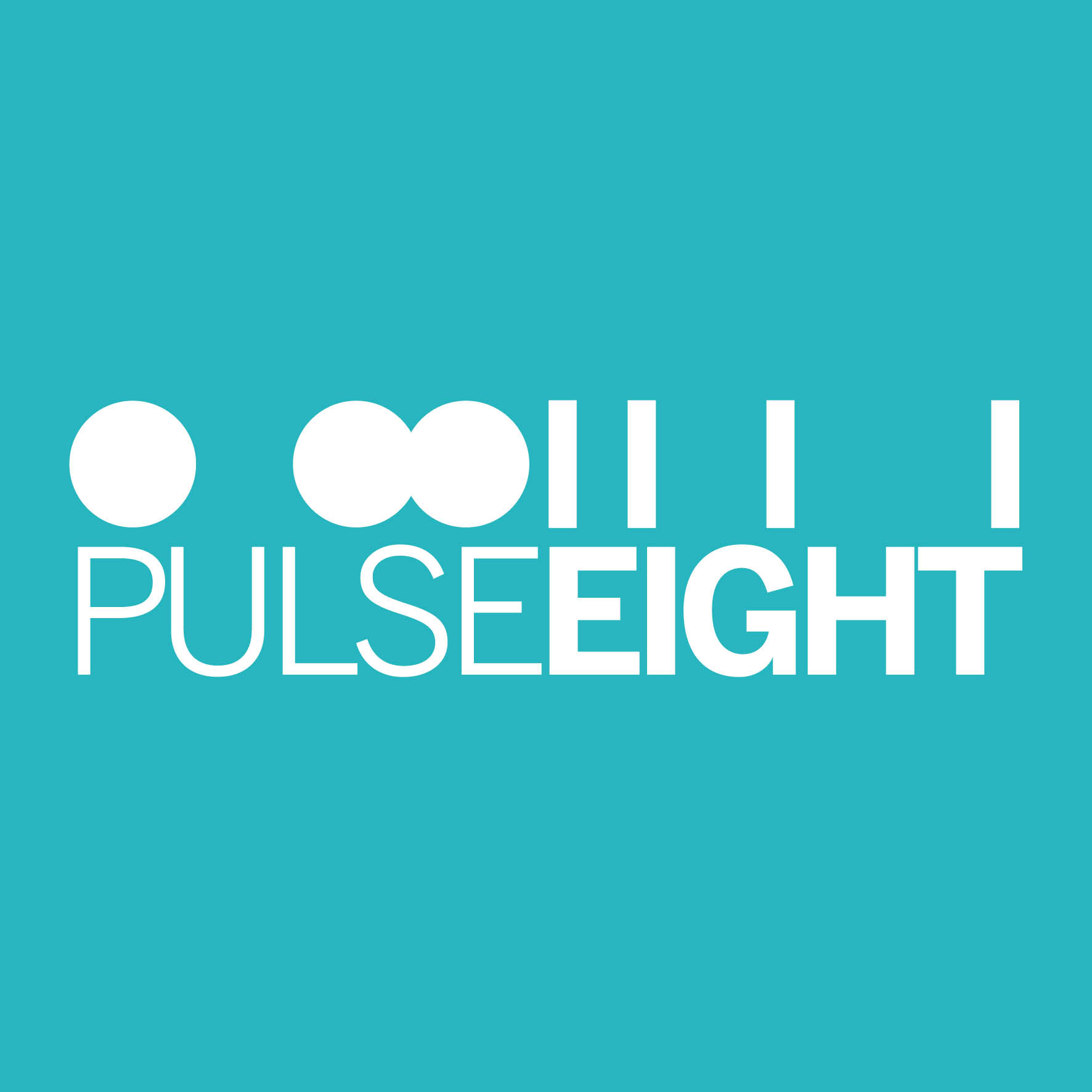
- Founded: 2010
- Headquarters: Poole, Dorset, United Kingdom
- Key people: Martin Ellis (Managing Director)
- Products: Set-top boxes, Remote controls, Computer hardware and Peripherals
- Website: Official website

Pulse-Eight Limited (Pulse-Eight) is a hardware designer and manufacturer based in the United Kingdom producing consumer electronics for the home entertainment and custom install industry.

On 22 October 2012, it was reported that Pulse-Eight had bought the TVonics brand and the technology behind TVonics DVRs from TVonics Solutions Limited, who had collapsed into administration in June 2012.

== Hardware products ==
Pulse-Eight's first major product line was a remote control, dubbed "Nyxboard Hybrid", made by Motorola designed for use within XBMC (now Kodi) and other Media Center software packages, a custom HTPC set-top-box pre-installed with XBMC that they call "PulseBox", and a USB and HDMI CEC Adapter designed in-house with additional smaller lines using components from ZOTAC.

=== Video Matrixes ===
Since 2012 Pulse-Eight has focused on developing video matrixes under their own brand "neo".

== Software products ==
=== PulseOS ===
Pulse-Eight used to offer a performance tuned free and open source embedded operating system that they call "PulseOS" designed to run on their PulseBox hardware platform, however since the discontinuation of their dedicated hardware the software enhancements have been merged with the main Kodi codebase.

=== libCEC ===
libCEC is an enabling platform for the CEC bus in HDMI, it allows developers to interact with other HDMI devices without having to worry about the communication overhead, handshaking, and the various ways of sending a message for each vendor, this software is free and open source available from GitHub

== See also ==
- TVonics
- XBMC Media Center
- Home theater PC
- Remote control
- Smart TV
