= ESpeak =

Compact, open-source, software speech synthesizer

eSpeakNG
- Original author: Jonathan Duddington
- Developer: Alexander Epaneshnikov et al.
- Release: February 2006; 20 years ago
- Stable release: 1.52 / 12 December 2024; 23 months ago
- Written in: C
- Operating system: Linux; Windows macOS; FreeBSD
- Type: Speech synthesizer
- License: GPLv3
- Website: github.com/espeak-ng/espeak-ng/
- Repository: github.com/espeak-ng/espeak-ng/

eSpeak is a free and open-source, cross-platform, compact, software speech synthesizer. It uses a formant synthesis method, providing many languages in a relatively small file size. eSpeakNG (Next Generation) is a continuation of the original developer's project with more feedback from native speakers.

Because of its small size and many languages, eSpeakNG is included in NVDA open source screen reader for Windows, as well as Android, Ubuntu and other Linux distributions. Its predecessor eSpeak was recommended by Microsoft in 2016 and was used by Google Translate for 27 languages in 2010; 17 of these were subsequently replaced by proprietary voices.

The quality of the language voices varies greatly. In eSpeakNG's predecessor eSpeak, the initial versions of some languages were based on information found on Wikipedia. Some languages have had more work or feedback from native speakers than others. Most of the people who have helped to improve the various languages are blind users of text-to-speech.

== History ==
In 1995, Jonathan Duddington released the Speak speech synthesizer for RISC OS computers supporting British English. On 17 February 2006, Speak 1.05 was released under the GPLv2 license, initially for Linux, with a Windows SAPI 5 version added in January 2007. Development on Speak continued until version 1.14, when it was renamed to eSpeak.

Development of eSpeak continued from 1.16 (there was not a 1.15 release) with the addition of an eSpeakEdit program for editing and building the eSpeak voice data. These were only available as separate source and binary downloads up to eSpeak 1.24. The 1.24.02 version of eSpeak was the first version of eSpeak to be version controlled using subversion, with separate source and binary downloads made available on SourceForge. From eSpeak 1.27, eSpeak was updated to use the GPLv3 license. The last official eSpeak release was 1.48.04 for Windows and Linux, 1.47.06 for RISC OS and 1.45.04 for macOS. The last development release of eSpeak was 1.48.15 on 16 April 2015.

eSpeak uses the Usenet scheme to represent phonemes with ASCII characters.

=== eSpeak NG ===
On 25 June 2010, Reece Dunn started a fork of eSpeak on GitHub using the 1.43.46 release. This started off as an effort to make it easier to build eSpeak on Linux and other POSIX platforms.

On 4 October 2015 (6 months after the 1.48.15 release of eSpeak), this fork started diverging more significantly from the original eSpeak.

On 8 December 2015, there were discussions on the eSpeak mailing list about the lack of activity from Jonathan Duddington over the previous 8 months from the last eSpeak development release. This evolved into discussions of continuing development of eSpeak in Jonathan's absence. The result of this was the creation of the espeak-ng (Next Generation) fork, using the GitHub version of eSpeak as the basis for future development.

On 11 December 2015, the espeak-ng fork was started. The first release of espeak-ng was 1.49.0 on 10 September 2016, containing significant code cleanup, bug fixes, and language updates.

== Features ==
eSpeakNG can be used as a command-line program, or as a shared library.

It supports Speech Synthesis Markup Language (SSML).

Language voices are identified by the language's ISO 639-1 code. They can be modified by "voice variants". These are text files which can change characteristics such as pitch range, add effects such as echo, whisper and croaky voice, or make systematic adjustments to formant frequencies to change the sound of the voice. For example, "af" is the Afrikaans voice. "af+f2" is the Afrikaans voice modified with the "f2" voice variant which changes the formants and the pitch range to give a female sound.

eSpeakNG uses an ASCII representation of phoneme names which is loosely based on the Usenet system.

Phonetic representations can be included within text input by including them within double square-brackets. For example: espeak-ng -v en "Hello [[w3:ld]]" will say Hello world in English.

== Synthesis method ==
ESpeakNG intro by eSpeakNG in English

eSpeakNG can be used as a text-to-speech translator in different ways, depending on which text-to-speech translation step the user wants to use.

=== 1. step – text to phoneme translation ===
There are many languages (notably English) which do not have straightforward one-to-one rules between writing and pronunciation; therefore, the first step in text-to-speech generation has to be text-to-phoneme translation.

1. input text is translated into pronunciation phonemes (e.g. input text xerox is translated into zi@r0ks for pronunciation).
2. pronunciation phonemes are synthesized into sound e.g., zi@r0ks is voiced as zi@r0ks in monotone way

To add intonation for speech i.e. prosody data are necessary (e.g. stress of syllable, falling or rising pitch of basic frequency, pause, etc.) and other information, which allows to synthesize more human, non-monotonous speech. E.g. in eSpeakNG format stressed syllable is added using apostrophe: z'i@r0ks which provides more natural speech: z'i@r0ks with intonation

For comparison two samples with and without prosody data:

1. [[DIs Iz m0noUntoUn spi:tS]] is spelled in monotone way
2. [[DIs Iz 'Int@n,eItI2d sp'i:tS]] is spelled intonated way

If eSpeakNG is used for generation of prosody data only, then prosody data can be used as input for MBROLA diphone voices.

=== 2. step – sound synthesis from prosody data ===
The eSpeakNG provides two different types of formant speech synthesis using its two different approaches. With its own eSpeakNG synthesizer and a Klatt synthesizer:

1. The eSpeakNG synthesizer creates voiced speech sounds such as vowels and sonorant consonants by additive synthesis adding together sine waves to make the total sound. Unvoiced consonants e.g. /s/ are made by playing recorded sounds, because they are rich in harmonics, which makes additive synthesis less effective. Voiced consonants such as /z/ are made by mixing a synthesized voiced sound with a recorded sample of unvoiced sound.
2. The Klatt synthesizer mostly uses the same formant data as the eSpeakNG synthesizer. But, it also produces sounds by subtractive synthesis by starting with generated noise, which is rich in harmonics, and then applying digital filters and enveloping to filter out necessary frequency spectrum and sound envelope for particular consonant (s, t, k) or sonorant (l, m, n) sound.

For the MBROLA voices, eSpeakNG converts the text to phonemes and associated pitch contours. It passes this to the MBROLA program using the PHO file format, capturing the audio created in output by MBROLA. That audio is then handled by eSpeakNG.

== Languages ==
eSpeakNG performs text-to-speech synthesis for the following languages:

1. Abkhaz
2. Afrikaans
3. Albanian
4. Amharic
5. Arabic (Note: Currently, only Arabic alphabet is supported.) (Note: Currently, only fully diacritized Arabic is supported.)
6. Aragonese
7. Armenian (East)
8. Armenian (West)
9. Aromanian
10. Assamese
11. Azerbaijani
12. Bashkir
13. Basque
14. Belarusian
15. Belter Creole (Lang Belta)
16. Bengali
17. Bishnupriya Manipuri
18. Bosnian (Note: Currently, only Cyrillic and Latin alphabets are supported.)
19. Bulgarian
20. Burmese
21. Catalan
22. Cherokee (Western) (Note: Currently, only Latin alphabet is supported.) (Note: Currently, only Cherokee-English Dictionary fully annotated UTF-8 pronunciation is supported.)
23. Chinese (Cantonese)
24. Chinese (Hakka) (Note: Currently, only Pha̍k-fa-sṳ is supported. Available in Sixian (Miaoli) accent.)
25. Chinese (Mandarin)
26. Chuvash
27. Crimean Tatar
28. Croatian
29. Czech
30. Danish
31. Dutch
32. English (American)
33. English (British)
34. English (Caribbean)
35. English (Lancastrian)
36. English (New York City) (Note: Currently unreleased; it must be built from the latest source code.)
37. English (Received Pronunciation)
38. English (Scottish)
39. English (West Midlands)
40. Esperanto
41. Estonian
42. Faroese
43. Finnish
44. French (Belgian)
45. French (France)
46. French (Swiss)
47. Gaelic (Irish)
48. Gaelic (Scottish)
49. Georgian
50. German
51. Greek (Ancient)
52. Greek (Modern)
53. Greenlandic
54. Guarani
55. Gujarati
56. Haitian Creole
57. Hawaiian
58. Hebrew
59. Hindi
60. Hungarian
61. Icelandic
62. Ido
63. Indonesian
64. Interlingua
65. Italian
66. Japanese (Note: Currently, only Hiragana and Katakana are supported.)
67. Kannada
68. Karakalpak
69. Kazakh
70. Kʼicheʼ
71. Klingon
72. Konkani
73. Korean
74. Kurdish
75. Kyrgyz
76. Latgalian
77. Latin
78. Latvian
79. Ligurian
80. Lingua Franca Nova
81. Lithuanian
82. Lojban
83. Lule Saami
84. Luxembourgish
85. Macedonian
86. Malay
87. Malayalam
88. Maltese
89. Māori
90. Marathi
91. Mongolian
92. Nahuatl (Classical)
93. Nepali
94. Nogai
95. Norwegian (Bokmål)
96. Oriya
97. Oromo
98. Papiamento
99. Pashto
100. Persian
101. Persian (Latin) (Note: Currently, only Farsi is supported.)
102. Polish
103. Portuguese (Brazilian)
104. Portuguese (Portugal)
105. Punjabi
106. Pyash (a constructed language)
107. Quechua
108. Quenya
109. Romanian
110. Russian
111. Russian (Latvia)
112. Serbian
113. Setswana
114. Shan (Tai Yai)
115. Sindarin
116. Sindhi
117. Sinhala
118. Slovak
119. Slovenian
120. Spanish (Latin American)
121. Spanish (Spain)
122. Swahili
123. Swedish
124. Tamil
125. Tatar
126. Telugu
127. Thai
128. Tigrinya
129. Totontepec Mixe
130. Turkish
131. Turkmen
132. Ukrainian
133. Urdu
134. Uyghur (Note: Currently, only Arabic and Latin alphabets are supported.)
135. Uzbek
136. Vietnamese (Central)
137. Vietnamese (Northern)
138. Vietnamese (Southern)
139. Welsh
140. Xextan (test voice)

== See also ==
- Festival Speech Synthesis System
- PlainTalk
- Google Translate
- Microsoft text-to-speech voices
- Speech
