= Philip Rubin =

American cognitive scientist and science administrator (born 1949)

Philip E. Rubin
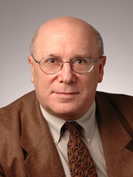

President, Rothschild Wilder
- Incumbent
- Assumed office January 2024

President, Federation of Associations in Behavioral and Brain Sciences (FABBS)
- In office January 2022 – January 2024
- Preceded by: Roxane Cohen Silver
- Succeeded by: Jeff Zacks

Principal Assistant Director for Science, Office of Science and Technology Policy
- In office June 2012 – 2015
- President: Barack Obama
- Director: John Holdren
- Preceded by: Carl Wieman (Associate Director)
- Succeeded by: Jo Handelsman (Associate Director)

CEO, Haskins Laboratories
- In office 2004–2012

Personal details
- Born: May 22, 1949 (age 77) Newark, New Jersey, U.S.
- Education: Brandeis University (BA); University of Connecticut (MA, PhD)
- Known for: Articulatory synthesis BRAIN Initiative; Cognitive science Computational modelling Dynamical Systems; Embodied cognition Engineering; Ethics of technology Human subjects and the Common Rule; Linguistics; Public policy Signal processing Sinewave synthesis
- Scientific career
- Fields: Psychology, Linguistics, Engineering
- Workplaces: Federation of Associations in Behavioral and Brain Sciences, Office of Science and Technology Policy, National Science Foundation, Haskins Laboratories, IEEE, University of Connecticut, Yale University
- Doctoral advisor: Michael Turvey, Alvin Liberman, Philip Lieberman, and Ignatius Mattingly

Philip E. Rubin (born May 22, 1949) is an American cognitive scientist, technologist, and science administrator known for raising the visibility of behavioral and cognitive science, neuroscience, and ethical issues related to science, technology, and medicine, at a national level. His research career is noted for his theoretical contributions and pioneering technological developments, starting in the 1970s, related to speech synthesis and speech production, including articulatory synthesis (computational modeling of the physiology and acoustics of speech production) and sinewave synthesis, and their use in studying complex temporal events, particularly understanding the biological bases of speech and language.

Rubin is the President and a Trustee of Rothschild Wilder, a private foundation that supports social justice and ethics, science and innovation, the arts and humanities, and the preservation of popular culture artifacts. He was also Chair of the Board of Directors of Haskins Laboratories in New Haven, Connecticut, where he is Chief Executive Officer emeritus and was for many years a senior scientist. In addition, he is a Professor Adjunct in the Department of Surgery, Otolaryngology at the Yale University School of Medicine, a Research Affiliate in the Department of Psychology at Yale University, a Fellow at Yale's Trumbull College, and a Trustee of the University of Connecticut. He is a past President of the Federation of Associations in Behavioral and Brain Sciences (FABBS).

From 2012 through Feb. 2015 he was the Principal Assistant Director for Science at the Office of Science and Technology Policy (OSTP) in the Executive Office of the President of the United States, and led the White House's neuroscience initiative, which included the BRAIN Initiative. He also served as the Assistant Director for Social, Behavioral and Economic Sciences at OSTP. For many years he has been involved with issues of science advocacy, education, funding, and policy.

== Education ==
Philip Rubin received his BA in psychology and linguistics in 1971 from Brandeis University and subsequently attended the University of Connecticut where he received his PhD in experimental psychology in 1975 under the tutelage of Michael Turvey, Ignatius Mattingly, Philip Lieberman, and Alvin Liberman.

== Career ==
Philip Rubin's research spans a number of disciplines, combining computational, engineering, linguistic, physiological, and psychological approaches to study embodied cognition, most particularly the biological bases of speech and language. He is best known for his work on articulatory synthesis (computational modeling of the physiology and acoustics of speech production), speech perception, sinewave synthesis, signal processing, perceptual organization, and theoretical approaches and modeling of complex temporal events. At the same time, he has been involved in leadership roles related to science administration, policy, and advocacy.

== Speech Synthesis and Speech Production ==
Starting in the early 1970s, Rubin worked on foundational issues in speech technology. These include: participating with Rod McGuire on Haskins aspects of the ARPANET Network Voice Protocol, a predecessor of Voice over IP; collaborating with Leonard Szubowicz, Douglas Whalen, and others on digitized speech, particularly extensions of the Haskins Pulse-code modulation (PCM) implementation, focusing on expanding temporal markers and event labels; and working with Patrick Nye on the Digital Pattern Playback, which was eventually replaced by Rubin's HADES system.

During his time at Haskins Laboratories, Rubin was responsible for the design of many computational models and other software systems. Most prominent are ASY, the Haskins articulatory synthesis program, and SWS, the Haskins sinewave synthesis program, both developed in the 1970s. ASY expanded the Mermelstein vocal-tract model developed at Bell Laboratories, adding additional articulatory control, simulation of nasal sounds, sound generation, and digital sound production. Most importantly, Rubin designed and implemented an approach for describing and controlling articulatory events, now known as speech gestures. In addition to use in standard articulatory synthesis, the ASY program has been used as part of a gestural-computational model that combines articulatory phonology, task dynamics, and articulatory synthesis. With Louis Goldstein and Mark Tiede, Rubin designed a radical revision of the articulatory synthesis model, known as CASY, the configurable articulatory synthesizer. This 3-dimensional model of the vocal tract permits researchers to replicate MRI images of actual speakers and has been used to study the relation between speech production and perception. With colleagues Hosung Nam, Catherine Browman, Louis Goldstein, Michael Proctor, Elliot Saltzman, and Mark Tiede, a software system called TADA was developed. It implemented the task dynamic model of inter-articulator speech coordination, incorporating also a coupled-oscillator model of inter-gestural planning, a gestural-coupling model, and portions of the Haskins articulatory model. The system also generated articulatory models of English utterances from either phonetic or orthographic text input.

The sinewave synthesis system designed by Rubin, known as SWS, is based on a technique for synthesizing speech by replacing the formants (main bands of energy) with pure tone whistles, and was designed to explore the spatiotemporal aspects of speech signals. It was the first sinewave synthesis system developed for the automatic, large-scale creation of stimuli for perceptual experiments, and has been used by Robert Remez, Rubin, David B. Pisoni, and other colleagues and researchers to study the time-varying characteristics of the speech signal. Rubin is also the designer of the HADES signal processing system and the SPIEL programming language, a predecessor of MATLAB.

From 1992 through 2012, Rubin was the core and administrative leader of Haskins Laboratories' main research activity, the National Institutes of Health/NICHD funded P-01 program project, “The Nature and Acquisition of the Speech Code and Reading.”

In 1998, he was the co-founder and first President of AVISA, the Auditory-Visual Speech Association, now part of the International Speech Communication Association (ISCA).

He was the co-creator, with Eric Vatikiotis-Bateson, of the Talking Heads website, which is no longer active.

== Theoretical Contributions ==
Dynamical systems / action theory perspective on speech.
With Carol Fowler, Robert Remez, and Michael Turvey, Rubin introduced the consideration of speech in terms of a dynamical systems / action theory perspective. Rubin's theoretical approach to perception and production, particularly in the case of speech, eschews attention to the momentary and punctate aspects of the signal, focusing not on traditional features and cues, but on spatiotemporal coordination of global aspects of the system, such as spectral coherence over long stretches of time (an approach related to current speech understanding systems, like Siri or Amazon Alexa).

Perceptual organization.
With Robert Remez and various other colleagues, he has used the technique of sinewave synthesis to explore perceptual organization. They have noted that "the criteria for the perceptual organization of speech - visible, audible, and even palpable - are actually specified in a general form, removed from any particular sensory modality ...", but, to Rubin, related to the underlying spectral coherence of signals created by coordinated physiological activity.

Events, gestures, and embodiment.
Rubin's approach stresses the constraints and structure stemming from the realities of embodied systems, again across both time and physical space. He expanded the modeling of speech production to incorporate an event based approach to control movement over time and articulatory space of the vocal tract, by building on the conceptual approach developed by Paul Mermelstein and colleagues at Bell Laboratories. This work was influenced, in part, by the event-based focus of James J. Jenkins. Rubin's articulatory synthesis model, ASY, illustrates how simple physical changes, such as velar opening, directly account for degrees of nasality, avoiding the complexity of attempting to reconcile numerous spectral cues. This event orientation evolved into a gestural computational system developed at Haskins Laboratories that combined ASY with the articulatory phonology of Catherine Browman and Louis Goldstein, and the task dynamic model of Elliot Saltzman. In this system utterances are organized ensembles (or constellations) of units of articulatory action called gestures. Each gesture is modeled as a dynamical system that characterizes the formation (and release) of a local constriction within the vocal tract (the gesture’s functional goal or `task’). Goldstein and Rubin have described the "dances of the vocal tract" that underlie the production of continuous speech.

Biomechanical constraints on inverse mapping.
Biomechanical constraints stemming from such embodiment also can be exploited in the recovery of vocal tract shapes from the acoustic signal as seen in the continuity mapping approach of John Hogden, used by Hogden, Rubin, and colleagues to re-conceptualize how realistic physical constraints affect pattern recognition. This involves reverse engineering the path from the acoustic signal to its physiological source (aka: the inverse problem) using a gradient maximum likelihood approach.

Audiovisual speech and multimodality.
Rubin expanded his approach to understanding the importance of spatiotemporal coordination in his collaborations on audiovisual speech with Eric Vatikiotis-Bateson, Hani Yehia, and other colleagues, focusing on multimodality by exploring the simultaneous combination of speech, facial information, and gesture, leading to innovations in analysis, synthesis, and simulation.

== National Science Foundation ==
From 2000 to 2003 Rubin was the Director of the Division of Behavioral and Cognitive Sciences (BCS) at the National Science Foundation (NSF) in Arlington, Virginia, where he helped launch the Cognitive Neuroscience, Human Origins (HOMINID), Documenting Endangered Languages, and other programs, was part of the NBIC convergence (Nanotechnology, Biotechnology, Information technology and Cognitive science) activities, and was the first chair of the Human and Social Dynamics priority area.

Rubin returned to the NSF during the second term of the Obama Administration to serve as a senior advisor in the Directorate for Social, Behavioral and Economic Sciences (SBE).

== Science Policy and Advocacy ==
Rubin has been in several leadership roles related to science policy and advocacy. From 2006 to 2011 he was the Chair of the National Academies Board on Behavioral, Cognitive, and Sensory Sciences; a member-at-large of the Board of the Federation of Associations in Behavioral and Brain Sciences (FABBS); and the co-leader of the Yale-Haskins Teagle Foundation Collegium on Student Learning. He is also the former Chairman of the Board of the Discovery Museum and Planetarium in Bridgeport, Connecticut, where he also worked with museum staff, trustees, city and state representatives, and others to establish the Discovery Magnet School on museum grounds, the first pre-K to 8 interdistrict public magnet school in the region with a science theme. He is also the former President and chair of the Board of Directors of FABBS.

== Ethical Issues Related to Research and Emerging Technologies ==
While at the NSF during the Bill Clinton and George W. Bush administrations, Rubin was the NSF ex officio representative to the National Human Research Protection Advisory Committee (NHRPAC) and the Secretary's Advisory Committee on Human Research Protections (SACHRP), established to provide advice to the Secretary of Health and Human Services on issues related to the protection of human research subjects. He was also the co-chair of the inter-agency National Science and Technology Council (NSTC) Committee on Science (COS) Human Subjects Research Subcommittee (HSRS) under the auspices of the President's Office of Science and Technology Policy (OSTP) and was also formerly the co-chair of the HSRS Behavioral Research Working Group. After leaving the NSF in 2003, he continued to be active on human subjects issues as they relate to public policy, including lecturing, writing, co-authoring with Judith Jarvis Thompson and others an AAUP report, participating in activities of the Yale Bioethics Center, and serving on the advisory board of the Journal of Empirical Research on Human Research Ethics.

Rubin has been a long-time member of the Yale University Technology and Ethics working group and Yale's Science, Technology, and Utopian Visions (STUVWG) and Mind, Brain, Culture and Consciousness (MBCC) working groups, both hosted by the Whitney Humanities Center. He was a member of the Steering Committee of MBCC. As part of the ongoing STUVWG activities, he has focused on the ethics of technology and developed the web-based Artificial Intelligence Reading List.

He has also expressed concerns about the ethical and scientific oversight of the use of certain tools and techniques by the intelligence, law enforcement, military, and national security communities, considering some of them to be boondoggles. An example includes his serving as the Chair of the National Research Council (NRC) Committee on Field Evaluation of Behavioral and Cognitive Sciences-Based Methods and Tools for Intelligence and Counter-Intelligence. In a workshop report from that committee he provided an analysis of the use of voice stress technologies in the detection of deception and said "not only is there no evidence that voice stress technologies are effective in detecting stress, but also the hypothesis underlying their use has been shown to be false." He was also a member of the NRC Committee on Developing Metrics for Department of Homeland Security Science and Technology Research. On April 6, 2011, he provided testimony at a hearing of the United States House Committee on Oversight and Reform - Behavioral Science and Security: Evaluating TSA's SPOT Program. In his written and oral congressional testimony, he criticized the TSA's SPOT passenger screening program, including raising concerns about the limitations that the Department of Homeland Security imposed on an outside review and oversight committee for the SPOT program, known as the Technical Advisory Committee (TAC), of which he was a member.

In May 2016 Rubin was a signatory to an Open Letter to the World Health Organization (WHO) calling on them to move or postpone the 2016 Summer Olympics in Rio de Janeiro over the 2016 epidemic of Zika fever. He also appeared on air on ESPN with Hannah Storm to discuss risk assessment and Zika.

== White House Office of Science and Technology Policy ==
In February 2012 Philip Rubin took a position as the Assistant Director for Social, Behavioral, and Economic Sciences at the Office of Science and Technology Policy (OSTP) in the Executive Office of the President of the United States. He also served as a senior advisor at the National Science Foundation in the Social, Behavioral and Economic Sciences (SBE) Directorate. At OSTP he led the White House's neuroscience initiative. On April 16, 2012, Congressman Chakah Fattah (D-PA) introduced House Resolution 613, supporting the OSTP interagency working group on neuroscience that Rubin organized. The resolution also "... commends President Barack Obama for the expeditious appointment of Dr. Philip Rubin to lead the working group's efforts." In June 2012 was named by John Holdren, Assistant to the President for Science and Technology and Director of OSTP, to be OSTP's Principal Assistant Director for Science, taking over the duties of Nobel laureate Carl Wieman, who resigned as Associate Director for Science on June 2. In this new role Rubin also became Co-Chair of the National Science and Technology Council's Committee on Science, serving with other Co-Chairs, Francis Collins and Subra Suresh, Directors of the NIH and NSF, respectively. He also co-chaired the interagency Common Rule Modernization Working Group.

During his tenure, key priorities for the OSTP Science Division included:

- Support for fundamental and translational research at NIH, NSF, NIST, and NASA.
- Public Access to research results, Open Data, and open science (led by Michael Stebbins).
- Large-scale, scientific infrastructure (led by Gerald Blazey, Altof Carim, and Tamara Dickinson), including such projects as ITER and the James Webb Space Telescope.
- Biomedical innovation (led by Michael Stebbins and Col. Geoffrey Ling, both of whom went on to propose "Creating the Health Advanced Research Projects Agency (HARPA)" for the Day One project, which led to ARPA-H).
- Neuroscience (led by Rubin and Carlos Peña, with contributions by Danielle Carnival, Meredith Drossback, Michael Stebbins, Carl Wieman, and others), including areas such as traumatic brain injury, neurodegenerative disease, the BRAIN Initiative, cognitive science, development, emotion, and learning, and the chartering of the NSTC Interagency Working Group on Neuroscience (IWGN). Rubin represented the White House at the G8 Dementia Summit on December 11, 2013 in London, held to shape an effective international response to dementia.
- Mental health, including areas such as PTSD, stigma, and suicide (Rubin and Stebbins).
- Forensic science (led by Tania Simoncelli, later Vice President, Translational Impact & Engagement at the Chan Zuckerberg Initiative).
- Behavioral science and social science (including planning meetings on behavioral economics, encouraged by Richard Suzman (then at NIH/NIA)), and supported by Philip Rubin, Alan Krueger (then at the Council of Economic Advisers), and Alan Kraut (then at the Association for Psychological Science), leading to the Behavioral Impacts program (led by Tom Kalil and Maya Shankar).
- Broadening participation in science (led by Joan Frye, now retired; Sean Jones, later Assistant Director for Mathematical and Physical Sciences at the NSF; and Danielle Carnival, later White House Cancer Moonshot Coordinator).
- Human subjects research issues (led by Rubin and Tania Simoncelli), including modernization of the Common Rule.
- Uniform Guidance for research and related regulations; grant reform; and graduate education reform (led by Joan Frye, Kelsey Cook, and Sean Jones).
- Language and communication, (led by Philip Rubin), including the chartering of an interagency NSTC working group.
- Aging, including interfacing with the White House Conference on Aging and with PCAST activities on technology and aging (Rubin).
- Space science (led by Tamara Dickinson, then principal assistant director for Energy and Environment at OSTP).

In February 2015, Rubin retired from OSTP and the NSF.

== Other Activities ==
Rubin was the founder, in 1984, and first president of YMUG (later known as YaleMUG, the Yale Macintosh Users Group) and the publisher of The Desktop Journal. Other co-founders and early members include Tony Cecala, Eric Celeste, Richard Crane, Ward J. McFarland, Jr., David Pogue, Michael D. Rabin, Tom Rielly, Elliot Schlessel, and Ed Seidel.

Rubin is the co-founder, with Elliot Saltzman, of the IS Group, an informal, collaborative group founded in the 1980s of scientists and technologists from around the country exploring cutting-edge issues such as dynamical systems, evolution, artificial intelligence, linguistics, robotics, network science, neuroscience, and other topics.

Between 1999 and some time in the early 2000s, Rubin was technical advisor at ZeniMax Media Parent company of video game publisher Bethesda Softworks.

Philip Rubin was a member of the American Academy of Arts and Sciences Challenges for International Scientific Partnerships (CISP) Large-Scale Science Working Group. He was also a member of the American Academy's Commission on Language Learning, created to examine the current state of language education in response to a bipartisan request from members of the United States Senate and House of Representatives.

Rubin is a member of the Beyond Conflict Scientific Advisory Committee. This organization assists leaders in divided societies who are struggling with conflict, reconciliation, and societal change. The initiative explores how insights from cognitive science and neuroscience can inform the practice of conflict resolution and diplomacy.

In May 2015 Rubin served as a judge for the DARPA Robotics Challenge (DRC) Robots4Us Student Video Contest and was an invited participant in the activities at the DRC Finals in June 2015.

On May 26–27, 2016 Rubin was a participant in the first ever White House Foster Care and Technology Hackathon.

From 2016 through 2019, Rubin served as Director and Treasurer of iGIANT (impact of Gender/Sex on Innovation and Novel Technologies), founded and led by Dr. Saralyn Mark. In Jan. 2020 Rubin was named as a Board Member Emeritus of iGIANT.

In 2017 and 2018, Rubin served as a member of the National Academy of Public Administration's NASA Advisory Council: Organizational Assessment panel. The NASA Authorization Act of 2017 directed the Academy to conduct a review "to assess the effectiveness of the NASA Advisory Council and to make recommendations to Congress."

In December, 2017, Governor of Connecticut, Dannel P. Malloy, appointed Philip Rubin to serve as a member of the UConn Board of Trustees, the governing body for the University of Connecticut.

In October, 2018, Rubin was elected as a member of the Board of Directors of Haskins Laboratories.

In December, 2019, he was appointed by the UConn Board as Vice-Chair, leading their new, legislatively encouraged standing committee on Research, Entrepreneurship and Innovation.

In January, 2021, Rubin became Editor of the Haskins Press, Haskins Laboratories, in New Haven, Connecticut.

In 2021, Rubin became a member of the Advisory Board for RISE: Reimagining Innovation in STEM Education, the NSF/IBM Education Convergence Accelerator.

In 2021, Rubin was named as a member of the International Selection Committee for the Franklin Institute's Bower Award and Prize for Achievement in Science.

In November, 2021, he was appointed as a member of UConn's Trustee-Administration-Faculty-Student (TAFS) Committee.

In January, 2022, Rubin took over as President of the Federation of Associations in Behavioral and Brain Sciences (FABBS).

In April, 2022, he was nominated by Ned Lamont, Governor of Connecticut, for reappointment to the University of Connecticut Board of Trustees and approved by unanimous consent of the CT Senate.

In January, 2023, Rubin was named as Chair of the Board of Directors of Haskins Laboratories.

In December, 2023, Sage Publishing featured an interview with Rubin, titled "Philip Rubin: FABBS’ Accidental Essential Man Linking Research and Policy", in their online S3: Social Science Space site.

In January, 2024, Rubin became the current Past President of the Federation of Associations in Behavioral and Brain Sciences (FABBS), a role in which he served through 2025.

In January, 2024, Rubin was named as President of Rothschild Wilder, a private foundation.

In January, 2026, Rubin was named as a member of the IEEE AgeTech leadership team.

In March, 2026, Rubin was an invited participant at the Asilomar for the Brain and Mind conference.

== Honors and awards ==
- 1999 – Elected to Fellow of the Acoustical Society of America
- 2002 – Elected to Fellow of the American Association for the Advancement of Science, for “ … major contributions to the understanding of human speech processing and the technology of speech analysis.”
- 2003 – Elected to Fellow of the Association for Psychological Science, for “… sustained outstanding achievements in psychological science.”
- 2003 – Award for “Commendable Performance ... for his superior leadership of all federal government departments and agencies involved in the protection of human subjects,” from the Human Subjects Research Subcommittee, Committee on Science, National Science and Technology Council, Office of Science and Technology Policy, Executive Office of the President of the United States
- 2006 – Elected to Fellow of the American Psychological Association, “… in recognition of outstanding and unusual contributions to the science and profession of psychology.”
- 2007 – Elected to member of the Philosophical Society of Washington
- 2007 – Elected to Fellow of Trumbull College at Yale University
- 2008 – Elected to member of Sigma Xi
- 2010 – American Psychological Association's Meritorious Research Service Commendation, “In recognition of your outstanding contributions to psychological science through your service as a leader in research management and policy development at the national level.”
- 2012 – Elected to Senior Member of the IEEE
- 2013 – Elected to Fellow of the National Academy of Public Administration
- 2014 – OSTP Award for Excellence, White House Office of Science and Technology Policy
- 2015 – Distinguished Service Award, COSSA (Consortium of Social Science Associations), "in recognition of his career of service to the social and behavioral science community."
- 2015 – Added to the FABBS (Federation of Associations in Behavioral and Brain Sciences) "In Honor Of ..." gallery of scientists, "recognizing eminent, senior scientists who have made important and lasting contributions to the sciences of mind, brain, and behavior."
- 2015 – Elected to Fellow of the Psychonomic Society
- 2016 – Granted lifetime membership in Nu Rho Psi, The National Honor Society in Neuroscience, "In recognition of outstanding achievement in the areas of neuroscience scholarship and research …".
- 2017 – Elected to member of the Connecticut Academy of Science and Engineering (CASE).
- 2020 – iGIANT Pioneer Award 2020, for "contributions to accelerating the translation of research into gender/sex-specific design elements."
- 2020 – Elected as the President-Elect of the Federation of Associations in Behavioral and Brain Sciences (FABBS)
- 2024 – Named as a Life Senior Member of the Institute of Electrical and Electronics Engineers (IEEE).
- 2025 - On January 1, 2025, he was named as a Fellow in the IEEE (the Institute of Electrical and Electronics Engineers), “for contributions in speech synthesis and analysis, neuroscience, and ethics of research and technology”, and also achieved the status of Life Fellow.

== Personal life ==
Philip Rubin was born on May 22, 1949, in Newark, New Jersey. He spent most of his childhood in Newark and graduated in 1967 from Union High School in Union, New Jersey, where his interest in science, along with classmates such as Marty Kaplan, was nurtured by the inspirational advanced biology teacher Irwin Jaeger. In the 1960s he was a co-founder and guitar player in the seminal New Jersey garage band, The Institution. Rubin is a photographer who, since the 1970s, has concentrated on pictures of wall art, including murals, graffiti, and painted buildings, in the urban centers of the cities that he has visited. Speaking of the transient nature of wall art, he has said, "The artist is often unknown; the passing of time and the public venues invite unanticipated collaboration." His work has been exhibited and sold at numerous venues. He is married to Joette Katz, retired Associate Justice of the Connecticut Supreme Court, and currently a partner at the law firm, Shipman & Goodwin LLP. They have two children, Dr. Jason Wilder Katz Rubin, a pediatrician and Associate Chief Medical Officer at St. Louis Children's Hospital and Associate Professor of Pediatrics at the Washington University School of Medicine in St. Louis, and Samantha Katz, a creative director, curator, and cultural consultant who is currently the VP of Programming + Experience at Summit Series, a division of Events.com.

== Popular culture influences ==
In 2007, Rubin invited the artists of ALL (Arts + Literature Laboratory)) to install a group exhibit in the Haskins Laboratories Gallery (artists included Howard el-Yasin, Sharon Steuer). (ALL has been relocated to Madison, WI)

In March 2010, Audiobulb Records released a CD by artist Autistici, titled Detached Metal Voice - Early Works (Vol. I). This album has been described as a collection of tracks that "explores the raw extrusion of the human condition." There is an homage to voice synthesis that includes excerpts from many of the early laboratory attempts to produce the human voice via articulatory synthesis, including work pioneered by Philip Rubin and colleagues at Haskins Laboratories, based on earlier work at Bell Laboratories.

Rorschach Audio - Art and Illusion for Sound discusses "Sine-Wave Speech, The Clangers" and other topics, influenced by the sinewave synthesis work of Rubin and colleagues.

The sinewave speech projection "Poulomi's Ode to Young-Hae Chang Heavy Industries" was presented at Rich Mix London on Dec. 3, 2010.

Manfred Bartmann, in 2017, made reference to the sine-wave work of Rubin, Remez, and others, and remarked on the similarity of sine-wave speech to the "warbling sounds of R2-D2". Bartmann incorporated sine-wave samples as part of CD Frisia Orientalis II: Making Music of Speech © 2017. On the CD, three tracks make use of sine-wave syntheses: No. 3 April '84 - fieldworking in East Frisia, No. 4 An East Frisian farm-hand song (Deenstenleed) revisited, and No. 5 Rökeldoab Dada, a grooving Low German mouth music. Bartmann says, "R2-D2's iconic sounds were created by sound designer Ben Burtt, and I always had thought that he had used a software developed by Philip Rubin way back then for the purpose of what was to be called sine-wave synthesis (Rubin 1982). However, in an interview ... on YouTube, Burtt pointed out that he just imitated the sounds that an infant would make."

In June 2022, an illustration of Rubin by noted cartoonist Drew Friedman appeared in Mineshaft #42. Mineshaft is an independent international art magazine that features the work of Robert Crumb and other alternative artists and writers. The illustration, titled "What kind of man reads Mineshaft?", shows Rubin in 2019 holding the 1957 Les Paul Special that he played in The Institution, the mid-1960s band that he co-founded. The illustration was adapted by Friedman for his 2024 book, Schtick Figures, a collection of cultural legends, and appears on page 103.

== Selected publications ==
- Rubin, P.; Turvey, M. T.; Van Gelder, P. (1976). "Initial phonemes are detected faster in spoken words than in spoken nonwords". Perception and Psychophysics. 19 (5): 394–398. doi:10.3758/bf03199398.
- Fowler, C. A., Rubin, P. E., Remez, R. E., & Turvey, M. T. (1980). Implications for speech production of a general theory of action. In B. Butterworth (Ed.), Language Production, Vol. I: Speech and Talk (pp. 373–420). New York: Academic Press.
- Rubin, P.; Baer, T.; Mermelstein, P. (1981). "An articulatory synthesizer for perceptual research". Journal of the Acoustical Society of America. 70 (2): 321–328. Bibcode:1981ASAJ...70..321R. doi:10.1121/1.386780.
- Remez, R. E.; Rubin, P. E.; Pisoni, D. B.; Carrell, T. D. (1981). "Speech perception without traditional speech cues". Science. 212 (4497): 947–950. Bibcode:1981Sci...212..947R. doi:10.1126/science.7233191. PMID 7233191.
- Kelso, J. A. S.; Holt, K. G.; Rubin, P.; Kugler, P. N. (1981). "Patterns of human interlimb coordination emerge from the properties of non-linear, limit-cycle oscillatory processes: theory and data". Journal of Motor Behavior. 13 (4): 226–261. doi:10.1080/00222895.1981.10735251. PMID 15215072.
- Browman, C. P.; Goldstein, L.; Kelso, J. A. S.; Rubin, P. E.; Saltzman, E. (1984). "Articulatory synthesis from underlying dynamics". Journal of the Acoustical Society of America. 75 (S1): S22. Bibcode:1984ASAJ...75...22B. doi:10.1121/1.2021330.
- Saltzman, E.; Rubin, P. E.; Goldstein, L.; Browman, C. P. (1987). "Task-dynamic modeling of interarticulator coordination". Journal of the Acoustical Society of America. 82 (S1): S15. Bibcode:1987ASAJ...82R..15S. doi:10.1121/1.2024673.
- Remez, R. E.; Rubin, P. E. (1990). "On the perception of speech from time-varying attributes: Contributions of amplitude variation". Perception & Psychophysics. 48 (4): 313–325. doi:10.3758/bf03206682. PMID 2243755.
- Remez, R.E.; Rubin, P.E.; Berns, S.M.; Pardo, J.S.; Lang, J.M. (1994). "On the perceptual organization of speech" (PDF). Psychological Review. 101 (1): 129–156. doi:10.1037/0033-295x.101.1.129. PMID 8121955.
- Rubin, Philip E. (1995). HADES: A Case Study of the Development of a Signal System. In R. Bennett, S. L. Greenspan & A. Syrdal (Eds.), Behavioral Aspects of Speech Technology: Theory and Applications. CRC Press, Boca Raton, 501-520.
- Rubin, P. & Vatikiotis-Bateson, E. (1998). Measuring and modeling speech production in humans. In S. L. Hopp & C. S. Evans (Eds.), Animal Acoustic Communication: Recent Technical Advances. Springer-Verlag, New York, 251-290.
- Rubin, P., & Vatikiotis-Bateson, E. (1998). Talking heads. In D. Burnham, J. Robert-Ribes, & E. Vatikiotis-Bateson (Eds.), International Conference on Auditory-Visual Speech Processing - AVSP'98 (pp. 231–235). Terrigal, Australia.
- Yehia, H.; Rubin, P.; Vatikiotis-Bateson, E. (1998). "Quantitative association of vocal-tract and facial behavior". Speech Communication. 26 (1–2): 23–24. doi:10.1016/S0167-6393(98)00048-X.
- Rubin, Philip. (2002). The regulatory environment for science: Protecting participants in research. In Albert H. Teich, Stephen D. Nelson, and Stephen J. Lita (eds.), AAAS Science and Technology Policy Yearbook 2002. American Association for the Advancement of Science, Washington, D.C., 199-206.
- Sieber, Joan E., Plattner, Stuart, and Rubin, Philip. (2002). How (Not) to Regulate Social and Behavioral Research. Professional Ethics Report, Vol. XV, No. 2, Spr. 2002, 1-4.
- Rubin, Philip. (2004). NSF reflections. American Psychological Society Observer, Vol. 17, No. 4, April 2004, 20-22.
- Thomson, Judith Jarvis, Elgin, Catherine, Hyman, David A., Rubin, Philip E. and Knight, Jonathan. (2006). Report: Research on Human Subjects: Academic Freedom and the Institutional Review Board. Academe, Volume 92, Number 5, September–October 2006.
- Goldstein, L. and Rubin, P. (2007). Speech: Dances of the Vocal Tract. Odyssey Magazine, Jan. 2007, 14-15.
- Hogden, J., Rubin, P., McDermott, E., Katagiri, S., and Goldstein, L. (2007). Inverting mappings from smooth paths through Rn to paths throughs Rm. A technique applied to recovering articulation from acoustics. Speech Communication, May 2007, Volume 49, Issue 5, 361-383.
- Gordon, Judith B.; Levine, Robert J.; Mazure, Carolyn M.; Rubin, Philip E.; Schaller, Barry R.; Young, John L. (2011). "Social Contexts Influence Ethical Considerations of Research". The American Journal of Bioethics. 11 (5): 24–30. doi:10.1080/15265161.2011.560338. PMID 21534146. S2CID 8858060.
- Rubin, P. (2011). "Cognitive Science." In: William Sims Bainbridge (ed.). Leadership in Science and Technology: A Reference Handbook. SAGE Publications: 2011.
- Remez, Robert E.; Rubin, Philip E. (2016). "Perceptual organization and lawful specification". Ecological Psychology. 28 (3): 160–165. doi:10.1080/10407413.2016.1195188. PMC 5021186. PMID 27642242.
- Rubin, Philip. (2018). Changes to the human subjects system: a view from someone formerly on the inside. FABBS Blog, February 16, 2018.
- Rubin, Philip and Munhall, Kevin. (2018). Obituary: Eric Vatikiotis-Bateson (1952-2017). Phonetica, 2018, Vol. 75, 187-189.
- Rubin, Philip E. (2019). Modernizing the Human Subjects Regulations. The Penn Regulatory Review, May 2, 2019.
- Rubin, Philip. (2019). In Memoriam: John T. Cacioppo (1951 – 2018). American Psychologist, 2019, Vol. 74, No. 6, 745.
- Lubell, Michael S. and Rubin, Philip. (2021). Biden's Big Science Challenge: Increasing Public Trust. Scientific American, March 15, 2021.
- Rubin, Philip. (2021). “Foreword.” In: Carol A. Fowler and Donald Shankweiler (eds.). Language and Life: Haskins Laboratories’ first half century. Haskins Press, New Haven, CT: 2021.
- Rubin, Philip. (2022). Arthur Abramson. In Oxford Research Encyclopedia of Linguistics, April 20, 2022. doi: https://doi.org/10.1093/acrefore/9780199384655.013.923
- Lubell, Michael S. and Rubin, Philip. (2025). What Trump’s First Days Say about Science in the New Administration. Scientific American, January 29, 2021.
- Whalen, D. H. and Rubin, P. E. (2025). Speech synthesis at Haskins Laboratories: From the pattern playback to articulatory synthesis. Journal of the Acoustical Society of America, 158(4(2)), A23, 2025.

== See also ==
- List of pioneers in computer science
