= Pattern playback =

Early talking device

The pattern playback is an early talking device that was built by Dr. Franklin S. Cooper and his colleagues, including John M. Borst and Caryl Haskins, at Haskins Laboratories in the late 1940s and completed in 1950. There were several different versions of this hardware device. Only one currently survives. The machine converts pictures of the acoustic patterns of speech in the form of a spectrogram back into sound. Using this device, Alvin Liberman, Frank Cooper, and Pierre Delattre (later joined by Katherine Safford Harris, Leigh Lisker, and others) were able to discover acoustic cues for the perception of phonetic segments (consonants and vowels). This research was fundamental to the development of modern techniques of speech synthesis, reading machines for the blind, the study of speech perception and speech recognition, and the development of the motor theory of speech perception.

To create sound, the pattern playback machine uses an arc light source which is directed against a rotating disk with 50 concentric tracks whose transparencies vary systematically in order to produce 50 harmonics of a fundamental frequency. The light is further projected against a spectrogram, whose reflectance corresponds to the sound pressure level of the partial of the signal, and is then directed towards a photovoltaic cell by which the light variation is converted into sound pressure variations.

The pattern playback was last used in an experimental study by Robert Remez in 1976. The pattern playback now resides in the Museum at Haskins Laboratories in New Haven, Connecticut.

The technique of pattern playback also now refers, more generally, to algorithms or techniques for converting spectrograms, cochleagrams, and correlograms from pictures back into sounds.

A demonstration is in the TV show Adventure. Pioneering technology in psycholinguistics (CBS Television. 1953).

== Digital pattern playback ==
In the 1970s, digital pattern playbacks began to supplant the earlier version. An early prototype was developed by Patrick Nye, Philip Rubin, and colleagues at Haskins Laboratories. It combined a "Ubiquitous Spectrum Analyzer" for automatic spectral analysis, along with a VAX GT-40 display processor for graphic manipulation of the displayed spectrogram, a form of "synthesis by art", and subsequent re-synthesis using a 40 channel filter bank. This hybrid hardware/software digital pattern playback was eventually replaced at Haskins Laboratories by the HADES analysis and display system, designed by Philip Rubin, and implemented in Fortran on the VAX family of computers. A more modern version has been described by Arai and colleagues . An on-line demonstration is available .

== See also ==
- Caryl Haskins
- Haskins Laboratories
- Alvin Liberman
- Reading machine
- Robert Remez
- Philip Rubin
- Spectrogram
- Motor theory of speech perception
- Speech synthesis
- Graphical sound

== Bibliography ==
- Cooper, F.S., Liberman, A. M., & Borst, J. M., The interconversion of audible and visible patterns as a basis for research in the perception of speech. Proceedings of the National Academy of Sciences, 1951, 37, 318-325.
- Cooper, Franklin S., Delattre, Pierre C., Liberman, A. M., Borst, J. M. & Gerstman, L. J., Some experiments on the perception of synthetic speech sounds. The Journal of the Acoustical Society of America, 1952, 24, 597-606.
- Cooper, Franklin S., Some instrumental aids to research on speech. In Report of the fourth annual round table meeting on linguistics and language teaching. Washington, D.C.: Institute of Languages and Linguistics, Georgetown University, 1953, 46-53.
- J. M. Borst, The use of spectrograms for speech analysis and synthesis, J. Audio Eng. Soc., 4, 14-23, 1956.
- Liberman, Alvin M., Some results of research on speech perception. The Journal of the Acoustical Society of America, 1957, 29, 117-123.
- Remez, Robert E., Adaptation of the category boundary between speech and nonspeech: A case against feature detectors. Cognitive Psychology, 1979, 11, 38-57.
- Malcolm Slaney. Pattern Playback from 1950 to 1995. Proceedings of the 1995 IEEE Systems, Man and Cybernetics Conference. October 22–25, 1995, Vancouver, Canada.
- Malcolm Slaney, Pattern Playback in the 90's, in Advances in Neural Information Processing Systems 7, Gerald Tesauro, David Touretzky, and Todd Leen (eds.), MIT Press, Cambridge, MA, 1995.
- T. Arai, K. Yasu and T. Goto, Digital pattern playback, Proc. Autumn Meet. Acoust. Soc. Jpn., 429-430, 2005.
- T. Arai, K. Yasu and T. Goto, Digital pattern playback: Converting spectrograms to sound for educational purposes, Acoust. Sci. & Tech., 27(6), 393-395, 2006
