= Articulatory phonology =

Articulatory phonology is a linguistic theory originally proposed in 1986 by Catherine Browman of Haskins Laboratories and Louis Goldstein of University of Southern California and Haskins. The theory identifies theoretical discrepancies between phonetics and phonology and aims to unify the two by treating them as low- and high-dimensional descriptions of a single system.

Unification can be achieved by incorporating into a single model the idea that the physical system (identified with phonetics) constrains the underlying abstract system (identified with phonology), making the units of control at the abstract planning level the same as those at the physical level.

The plan of an utterance is formatted as a gestural score, which provides the input to a physically based model of speech production – the task dynamic model of Elliot Saltzman. The gestural score graphs locations within the vocal tract where constriction can occur, indicating the planned or target degree of constriction. A computational model of speech production developed at Haskins Laboratories combines articulatory phonology, task dynamics, and the Haskins articulatory synthesis system developed by Philip Rubin and colleagues.

== Bibliography ==
- Browman, C. P.; Goldstein, L.; Kelso, J. A. S.; Rubin, P. E.; Saltzman, E. (1984). "Articulatory synthesis from underlying dynamics". Journal of the Acoustical Society of America. 75 (S1): S22. Bibcode:1984ASAJ...75...22B. doi:10.1121/1.2021330.
- Browman, C.P. and Goldstein, L. (1986). Towards an articulatory phonology. In C. Ewen and J. Anderson (eds.) Phonology Yearbook 3. Cambridge: Cambridge University Press, pp. 219–252.
- Browman, C.P.; Goldstein, L. (1992). "Articulatory phonology: an overview". Phonetica. 49 (3–4): 155–180. doi:10.1159/000261913. PMID 1488456. S2CID 18762167.
- Browman, C.P. and Goldstein, L. (1993). Dynamics and articulatory phonology. Status Reports on Speech Research, SR-l 13. New Haven: Haskins Laboratories, pp. 51–62.
- Browman, Catherine. P.; Goldstein, Louis M. (2000). "Competing constraints on intergestural coordination and self-organization of phonological structures". Es Cahiers de l'ICP, Bulletin de la Communication Parlée. 5: 25–34.
- Fowler, C.A., Rubin, P. Remez, R.E. and Turvey, M.T. (1980). Implications for speech production of a general theory of action. In B. Butterworth (ed.) Language Production. New York, NY: Academic Press, pp. 373–420.
- Goldstein, Louis M., and Carol Fowler. (2003). Articulatory phonology: a phonology for public language use.” In Phonetics and Phonology in Language Comprehension and Production: Differences and Similarities, ed. Antje S. Meyer and Niels O. Schiller. Mouton de Gruyter
- Rubin, P.; Baer, T.; Mermelstein, P. (1981). "An articulatory synthesizer for perceptual research". Journal of the Acoustical Society of America. 70 (2): 321–328. Bibcode:1981ASAJ...70..321R. doi:10.1121/1.386780.
- Kröger, B.J. (1993). A gestural production model and its application to reduction in German. Phonetica 50: 213-233.
- Kröger, B.J., Birkholz, P. (2007). A gesture-based concept for speech movement control in articulatory speech synthesis. In: Esposito A, Faundez-Zanuy M, Keller E, Marinaro M (eds.) Verbal and Nonverbal Communication Behaviours, LNAI 4775 (Springer, Berlin) pp. 174-189
- Saltzman, E. (1986). Task dynamic co-ordination of the speech articulators: a preliminary model. In H. Heuer and C. Fromm (eds.) Generation and Modulation of Action Patterns. Berlin: Springer-Verlag, pp. 129–144.
- Saltzman, E.; Kelso, J. A. S. (1987). "Skilled actions: A task dynamic approach". Psychological Review. 94 (1): 84–106. doi:10.1037/0033-295X.94.1.84. PMID 3823306.
- Tatham, M. A. A. (1996). Articulatory phonology and computational adequacy. In R. Lawrence (ed.). Proceedings of the Institute of Acoustics, Vol. 18, Part 9. St. Albans: IoA, 375-382.
