= Elliot Saltzman =

American psychologist

Elliot Saltzman is an American psychologist and speech scientist. He is a professor in the Department of Physical Therapy at Boston University and a Senior Scientist at Haskins Laboratories in New Haven, Connecticut. He is best known for his development, with J. A. Scott Kelso of "task dynamics ." He is also known for his contributions to the development of a gestural-computational model at Haskins Laboratories that combines task dynamics with articulatory phonology and articulatory synthesis. His research interests include application of theories and methods of nonlinear dynamics and complexity theory to understanding the dynamical and biological bases of sensorimotor coordination and control. He is the co-founder, with Philip Rubin, of the IS group.

== Education ==
Elliot Saltzman received his A.B. in psychology from Harvard University in 1970 and his Ph.D. in developmental psychology from the University of Minnesota in 1979.

== Selected publications ==
- Saltzman, E. (1979). Levels of sensorimotor representation. Journal of Mathematical Psychology, 91–163.
- Browman, C. P., Goldstein, L., Kelso, J. A. S., Rubin, P. E., & Saltzman, E. (1984). Articulatory synthesis from underlying dynamics. Journal of the Acoustical Society of America, 75, S22.
- Saltzman, E. (1986) Task dynamic coordination of the speech articulators: a preliminary model. In H. Heuer and C. Fromm (eds.) Generation and Modulation of Action Patterns. Berlin: Springer-Verlag, pp. 129–144
- Saltzman, E., & Kelso, J. A. S. (1987). Skilled actions: A task dynamic approach. Psychological Review, 94, 84–106.
- Saltzman, E., Rubin, P. E., Goldstein, L., & Browman, C. P. (1987). Task-dynamic modeling of interarticulator coordination. Journal of the Acoustical Society of America, 82, S15.
- Saltzman, E. L. & Munhall, K. G. (1989). A dynamical approach to gestural patterning in speech production. Ecological Psychology, 1, (4), 333–382.
- Turvey, M.T., Saltzman, E., & Schmidt, R.C. (1991). Dynamics and task-specific coordinations. In N. I. Badler, B. A. Barsky, & D. Zeltzer, (Eds.). Making them move: Mechanics, control, and animation of articulated figures. San Mateo, CA: Morgan Kaufmann. (pp. 157–170).
- Saltzman, E., & Munhall, K. G. (1992). Skill acquisition and development: The roles of state-, parameter-, and graph-dynamics. Journal of Motor Behavior, 24(1), 49–57.
- Saltzman, E. (1992). Biomechanical and haptic factors in the temporal patterning of limb and speech activity. Human Movement Science, 11, 239–251.
- Fowler, C. A., & Saltzman, E. (1993). Coordination and coarticulation in speech production. Speech Communication, 36 (2,3), 171–195.
- Hogden, J., Rubin, P., & Saltzman, E. (1996). An unsupervised method for learning to track tongue position from an acoustic signal. Bulletin de la Communication Parlèe.
- Saltzman, E., Lofqvist, A., Kay, B., Kinsella-Shaw, J. & Rubin, P. (1998). Dynamics of intergestural timing: a perturbation study of lip-larynx coordination. Journal of Experimental Brain Research, 123, 412–424.
- Saltzman, E., & Byrd, D. (1998) Tending the garden or the plant? Bulletin de la Communication Parlee, no 4, p. 79-83.
- Saltzman, E., & Byrd, D. (2000). Task-dynamics of gestural timing: Phase windows and multifrequency rhythms. Human Movement Science, 19, 999–526.
