= Ignatius Mattingly =

American linguist (1927–2004)

Ignatius G. Mattingly (1927–2004) was a prominent American linguist and speech scientist. Prior to his academic career, he was an analyst for the National Security Agency from 1955 to 1966. He was a Lecturer and then Professor of Linguistics at the University of Connecticut from 1966 to 1996 and a researcher at Haskins Laboratories from 1966 until his death in 2004. He is best known for his pioneering work on speech synthesis and reading and for his theoretical work on the motor theory of speech perception in conjunction with Alvin Liberman. He received his B.A. in English from Yale University in 1947, his M.A. in Linguistics from Harvard University in 1959, and his Ph.D. in English from Yale University in 1968.

== Speech Synthesis ==
Ignatius Mattingly, working with British collaborators, John N. Holmes and J.N. Shearme, adapted the Haskins Pattern playback rules to write the first computer program for synthesizing continuous speech from a phonetically spelled input. A further step toward a reading machine for the blind combined Mattingly's program with an automatic look-up procedure for converting alphabetic text into strings of phonetic symbols. In the 1960s he also produced the first prosodic synthesis by rule.

== Bibliography ==
- Mattingly, I. G., Liberman, A. M., Syrdal, A. K., & Halwes, T. (1971). Discrimination in speech and nonspeech modes. Cognitive Psychology, 2, 131-157.
- Mattingly, I. G. (1972). Reading, the linguistic process, and linguistic awareness. In J. F. Kavanagh & I. G. Mattingly (Eds.), Language by ear and by eye: The relationships between speech and reading. (pp. 133–147). Cambridge, MA: MIT Press.
- Mattingly, I. G. (1972). Speech cues and sign stimuli. American Scientist, 60, 327-337.
- Mattingly, Ignatius G. (1974). Speech synthesis for phonetic and phonological models. In Thomas A. Sebeok (Ed.), Current Trends in Linguistics, Volume 12, Mouton, The Hague, pp. 2451–2487.
- Liberman, A. M. & Mattingly, I. G. (1985). The motor theory of speech perception revised. Cognition, 21, 1-36.
- Mattingly, I. G. (1990). The global character of phonetic gestures. Journal of Phonetics, 18, 445-452.
- Mattingly, I. G. (1991). Reading and the biological function of linguistic representation. In I. G. Mattingly & M. Studdert-Kennedy (Eds.), Modularity and the Motor Theory of Speech Perception (pp. 339–346). Hillsdale, NJ: Lawrence Erlbaum.
