= Louis Goldstein =

Louis Goldstein may refer to:

- Louis L. Goldstein, politician
- Louis M. Goldstein, linguist
