= Louis M. Goldstein =

American linguist

- Occupations: Linguist; cognitive scientist; professor
- Known for: Articulatory phonology

Academic background
- Education: Brandeis University (B.A.); UCLA (Ph.D.)

Louis M. Goldstein is an American linguist and cognitive scientist. He was previously a professor and chair of the Department of Linguistics and a professor of psychology at Yale University and is now a professor in the Department of Linguistics at the University of Southern California. He is a senior scientist at Haskins Laboratories in New Haven, Connecticut, and a founding member of the Association for Laboratory Phonology. Notable students of Goldstein include Douglas Whalen and Elizabeth Zsiga.

He is best known for the development, with Catherine Browman, of the theory of articulatory phonology, a gesture-based approach to phonological and phonetic structure. The theoretical approach is incorporated in a computational model that generates speech from a gesturally-specified lexicon. Goldstein, Philip Rubin, and Mark Tiede designed a revision of the articulatory synthesis model, known as CASY, the Configurable Articulatory Synthesizer. This three-dimensional model of the vocal tract permits researchers to replicate MRI images of actual speakers and has been used to study the relation between speech production and perception.

== Education ==
Louis Goldstein received his undergraduate degree from Brandeis University and his Ph.D. in linguistics from UCLA in 1977.

== Current work ==
Goldstein's current research involves the development of the gestural model and its application to three problems. (1) Phonological encoding in speech production. The nature of the representations assembled during speech production are investigated experimentally, including measurement of articulatory activity during speech errors. (2) The emergence of phonological structure. Research includes the analysis of infant and child behavior and modeling the growth of phonological structure through the interaction of computational agents. (3) Syllable structure. Syllable structures are modeled as stable modes of inter-gestural coordination. Cross-language empirical studies attempt to find the modes that can occur human languages. Theoretical work attempts to understand these modes and their variability from the perspective of the dynamics of coupled oscillators.

== Selected publications ==
- Browman, Catherine. P., and Louis M. Goldstein. 2000. Competing constraints on intergestural coordination and self-organization of phonological structures. Les Cahiers de l'ICP, Bulletin de la communication parlée 5:25–34.
- Goldstein, Louis M., and Carol Fowler. 2003. Articulatory phonology: a phonology for public language use." In Phonetics and Phonology in Language Comprehension and Production: Differences and Similarities, ed. Antje S. Meyer and Niels O. Schiller. Mouton de Gruyter
- Studdert-Kennedy, Michael, and Louis M. Goldstein. 2003. Launching language: The gestural origin of discrete infinity. In Language Evolution, ed. Morten H. Christiansen and Simon Kirby, Studies in the Evolution of Language. New York: Oxford University Press.
