= Franklin S. Cooper =

American physicist and inventor (1908–1999)

Franklin Seaney Cooper (April 29, 1908 – February 20, 1999) was an American physicist and inventor who was a pioneer in speech research.

== Biography ==
He attended the University of Illinois where he received his undergraduate degree in physics in 1931, and received his Ph.D. in physics from the Massachusetts Institute of Technology in 1936. In 1935, with Caryl Haskins, he founded Haskins Laboratories, a nonprofit research laboratory that is located in New Haven, Connecticut, and studied speech and language. His primary interest was in speech synthesis and perception, which led him to invent the pattern playback, an early electromechanical device for synthesizing speech. It became a forerunner of contemporary computer-based speech synthesis programs and was used by many scientists at Haskins to discover the critical cues for speech synthesis and recognition. Cooper designed other special-purpose synthesizers in the early 1950s, including Octopus, Voback, Intonator, and Alexander. Of these four, only the Voback and the Intonator, which were "parasitic on Homer Dudley's Vocoder", were used extensively for perceptual experiments. He was aided in the construction of these devices by the late John M. Borst.

During World War II, at the request of Vannevar Bush, Cooper took a position in the Office of Scientific Research and Development. He also returned to Washington in 1973, when he was selected to form a panel of six experts charged with investigating the famous 18-minute gap in the White House office tapes of President Richard Nixon related to the Watergate scandal .

Cooper was the president and director of research at Haskins Laboratories from 1955 to 1975. During this period he directed and provided theoretical input and guidance to many projects, including the Haskins prototype for the reading machine for the blind. He also advocated a program in electromyography to look "upstream" in the musculature at the control of motor activity in speech. He was an early advocate of the motor theory of speech perception. This led to a great deal of work at Haskins on the physiological mechanisms underlying the production of speech carried out under the leadership of Katherine S. Harris.

Cooper had many academic positions and affiliations. He was the winner of many awards, including the Silver Medal from the Acoustical Society of America. After stepping down as president and research director at Haskins Laboratories, he served as associate research director until 1986. After retiring, he moved to Palo Alto, California, in 1989.

== Bibliography ==
- Abramson, A. S. (May 2000). "Franklin S. Cooper: Pioneer and educator in speech". Journal of the Acoustical Society of America, Vol. 107, #5, 2825-2826.
- Franklin S. Cooper, expert on speech perception. Palo Alto Weekly, March 10, 1999.
- "The Secretary and the Tapes Tangle". Time, December 10, 1973.

== Selected publications ==
- Cooper, F. S., & Kruger, P. G. Standard wavelengths in the copper spectrum in the region 80A to 650A. Physical Review, 1933, 44, 324.
- Cooper, F. S., Buchwald, C. E., Haskins, C. P., & Evans, R. D. Electron bombardment of biological materials: I. An electron tube for the production of homogeneous beams of cathode rays from one to fifteen kilovolts. Review of Scientific Instrumentation, 1939, 10, 74-77.
- Cooper, F. S. Spectrum analysis. Journal of the Acoustical Society of America, 1950, 22, 761-762.
- Cooper, F. S. Guidance devices for the blind. Physics Today, 1950, 3, 6-14.
- Cooper, F. S., Liberman, A. M., & Borst, J. M. The interconversion of audible and visible patterns as a basis for research in the perception of speech. Proceedings of the National Academy of Sciences, 1951, 37,318-325.
- Cooper, F. S., Delattre, P. C., Liberman, A. M., Borst, J. M., & Gerstman, L. J. Some experiments on the perception of synthetic speech sounds. Journal of the Acoustical Society of America, 1952, 24, 597-606.
- Liberman, A. M., Ingemann, F., Lisker, L., Delattre, P. C., & Cooper, F. S. Minimal rules for synthesizing speech. Journal of the Acoustical Society of America, 1959, 31, 1490-1499.
- Liberman, A. M., Cooper, F. S., Harris, K. S., & MacNeilage, P. F. A motor theory of speech perception. Proceedings of the Speech Communication Seminar, Stockholm, 1962.
- Cooper, F. S. Toward a high-performance reading machine for the blind. In Bennet, Degan, & Spiegel (Eds.), Human factors in technology. New York: McGraw-Hill, 1963.
- Liberman, A. M., Cooper, F. S., Shankweiler, D. P., & Studdert-Kennedy, M. Perception of the speech code. Psychological Review, 1967, 74, 431-461.
- Cooper, F. S. Haskins Laboratories: Research on human communication, marine ecology, and the biochemistry of protozoa. Science, 1967, 158, 1213-1215.
- Cooper, F. S., & Mattingly, I. G. Computer-controlled PCM system for investigation of dichotic speech perception. Journal of the Acoustical Society of America, 1969, 46, 115.
- Cooper, F. S., Gaitenby, J. H., Mattingly, I. G., & Umeda, N. Reading aids for the blind: A special case of machine-to-man communication. IEEE Transactions on Audio and Electroacoustics, 1969, AU-17, 266-270.
- Sawashima, M., Abramson, A. S., Cooper, F. S., & Lisker, L. Observing laryngeal adjustments during running speech by use of a fiberoptics system. Phonetica, 1970, 22, 193-201.
- Bolt, R. H., Cooper, F. S., David, E. E., Jr., Denes, P. B., Pickett, J. M., & Stevens, K. N. Speaker identification by speech spectrograms: A scientists' view of its reliability for legal purposes. Journal of the Acoustical Society of America, 1970, 47, 597-612.
- Cooper, F. S., Gaitenby, J. H., & Nye, P. W. Evolution of Reading Machines for the Blind: Haskins Laboratories' Research as a Case History. Journal of Rehabilitation Research and Development, 1984, Vol. 2l, No. 1., 51-87.
