= Reading machine =

A reading machine is a piece of assistive technology that allows blind people to access printed materials. It scans text, converts the image into text by means of optical character recognition and uses a speech synthesizer to read out what it has found.

== Development ==
The first prototype of reading machine, called optophone, was developed by Dr. Edmund Edward Fournier d'Albe of Birmingham University in 1913. Five vertically-aligned photodetectors were used to scan a line of printed text. Each cell generated a different tone (G, C, D, E, G8) when detecting black print, so that each character was associated with a specific time-varying chords of tones. With some practice, blind users were able to interpret this audio output as a meaningful message. However, the reading speed of this device was very slow (approximately one word per minute).

From 1944 until up to the 1970s, new prototypes of reading machine were developed at Haskins Laboratories under contract from the Veterans Administration. The research project was conducted by Caryl Parker Haskins, Franklin S. Cooper and Alvin Liberman. Their first attempts to improve the optophone all ended in failures, and users were still unable to read more than 5 words per minutes in average, even after long training sessions. This observation led Liberman to suppose that the limitation was cognitive rather than technical, and to formulate his motor theory of speech perception. He realized that the speech signal was not heard like an acoustic "alphabet" or "cipher," but as a "code" of overlapping speech gestures, due to coarticulation. Therefore, a reading machine cannot simply convert the printed characters into a series of abstract sounds, rather it must be able to identify the characters and to produce a speech sound as output using a speech synthesizer.

The first commercial reading machine for the blind was developed by Kurzweil Computer Products (later acquired by Xerox Corporation) in 1975. Walter Cronkite used this machine to give his signature sound off, "And that's the way it is, January 13, 1976."

In the mid-1960s, Francis F. Lee joined Dr. Samuel Jefferson Mason's Cognitive Information Processing Group in the Research Laboratory of Electronics at the Massachusetts Institute of Technology to work on a reading machine for the blind, the first system that would scan text and produce continuous speech. Early reading machines were desk-based and large, found in libraries, schools, and hospitals or owned by wealthy individuals. In 2009, a cellphone running Kurzweil-National Federation of the Blind software works as a reading machine.
