= Duplex perception =

Simultaneous perception of both a speech and nonspeech sound

Duplex perception refers to the linguistic phenomenon whereby "part of the acoustic signal is used for both a speech and a nonspeech percept." A listener is presented with two simultaneous, dichotic stimuli. One ear receives an isolated third-formant transition that sounds like a nonspeech chirp. At the same time the other ear receives a base syllable. This base syllable consists of the first two formants, complete with formant transitions, and the third formant without a transition. Normally, there would be peripheral masking in such a binaural listening task but this does not occur. Instead, the listener's percept is duplex, that is, the completed syllable is perceived and the nonspeech chirp is heard at the same time. This is interpreted as being due to the existence of a special speech module.

The phenomenon was discovered in 1974 by Timothy C. Rand at the Haskins Laboratories associated with Yale University.

Duplex perception was argued as evidence for the existence of distinct systems for general auditory perception and speech perception. It is also notable that this same phenomenon can be obtained with slamming doors.

== See also ==
- McGurk effect
