= Michael Turvey =

Michael T. Turvey (February 14, 1942 - August 12, 2023) was the Board of Trustees' Distinguished Professor of Experimental Psychology at the University of Connecticut and a Senior Scientist at Haskins Laboratories in New Haven, Connecticut. He is best known for his pioneering work in ecological psychology and in applying the dynamical systems approach to the study of motor behavior. He was the founder of the Center for the Ecological Study of Perception and Action. His research spans a number of areas including: dynamic touch and haptics, interlimb coordination, visual perception and optic flow, postural stability, visual word recognition and speech perception. Along with William Mace and Robert Shaw, he was one of the leading explicators of the ecological psychology of J. J. Gibson. His pioneering work with J. A. Scott Kelso and Peter N. Kugler introduced the physical language of complex systems to the understanding of perception and action. He also helped introduce the ideas of the Russian motor control theorist Nikolai Bernstein and his colleagues to a larger audience. Working with Georgije Lukatela and other colleagues at Haskins Laboratories, he exploited the dual nature of the Serbo-Croatian orthography to help understand word recognition.

Turvey also won the 2004 Ig Nobel Prize in Physics along with Professor Ramesh Balasubramaniam of Cognitive & Information Sciences at the University of California, Merced, for exploring and explaining the dynamics of hula-hooping. (Reference: "Coordination Modes in the Multisegmental Dynamics of Hula Hooping," Ramesh Balasubramaniam and Michael T. Turvey, Biological Cybernetics, vol. 90, no. 3, March 2004, pp. 176–90.)

Turvey attended Clapham College, a Jesuit school in South London, then graduated from Loughborough University (then called Loughborough College) in 1963 with a DLC (Diploma of Loughborough College) in Physical Education, with First Class Honours. He received an MA (1964) in Physical Education from the Ohio State University. He received a PhD (1967) in Experimental and Physiological Psychology from the Ohio State University under Delos Wickens, with thesis The nature of information loss in the visual preperceptual system.

== Representative publications ==
- Turvey, M. T. (1973). On peripheral and central processes in vision: Inferences from an information-processing analysis of masking with patterned stimuli. Psychological Review, 80, 1–52.
- Turvey, M. T. (1977). Contrasting orientations to the theory of visual information processing. Psychological Review, 84, 67–88.
- Kugler, N. P., Kelso, J. A. S., & Turvey, M. T. (1980). On the concept of coordinative structures as dissipative structures: I. Theoretical lines of convergence. Tutorials in Motor Behavior, G. E. Stelmach and J. Requin, eds., North-Holland Publishing Company.
- Fowler, C. A., Rubin, P. E., Remez, R. E., & Turvey, M. T. (1980). Implications for speech production of a general theory of action. In B. Butterworth (Ed.), Language Production, Vol. I: Speech and Talk (pp. 373–420). New York: Academic Press.
- Turvey, M. T., & Carello, C. (1985). The equation of information and meaning from the perspectives of situation semantics and Gibson's ecological realism. Linguistics and Philosophy, 8, 81–90.
- Turvey, M. T. (1990). Coordination. American Psychologist, 45(8), 938–953.
- Turvey, M. T., Shockley, K., & Carello, C. (1999). Affordance, proper function, and the physical basis of perceived heaviness. Cognition, 17, B17-B26.
- Kunkler-Peck, A., & Turvey, M. T. (2000). Hearing shape. Journal of Experimental Psychology: Human Perception and Performance, 26, 279–294.
- Lukatela, G., & Turvey, M. T. (2000). An evaluation of the two-cycles model of phonology assembly. Journal of Memory and Language, 42, 183–207.
- Kim, N-G., Fajen, B., & Turvey, M. T. (2000). Perceiving circular heading in noncanonical flow fields. Journal of Experimental Psychology: Human Perception and Performance, 26, 31–56.
- Goodman, L., Riley, M., Mitra, S., & Turvey, M. T. (2000). Advantages of rhythmic movements at resonance: Minimal active degrees of freedom, minimal noise, and maximal predictability. Journal of Motor Behavior, 32, 3–8.
- Turvey, M. T., & Fonseca, S. (2009). Nature of motor control: perspectives and issues. Advances in Experimental Medicine and Biology, 629, 93–123.

== See also ==
- Cognitive science
- Embodied cognitive science
- Experimental psychology
- Haptic perception
- Ecological psychology
- Dynamical systems
- Haskins Laboratories
- James J. Gibson
- Perception
- Psychology
- University of Connecticut
