= Sinewave synthesis =

Technique for synthesizing speech

Sinewave synthesis, or sine wave speech, is a technique for synthesizing speech by replacing the formants (main bands of energy) with pure tone whistles. The first sinewave synthesis program (SWS) for the automatic creation of stimuli for perceptual experiments was developed by Philip Rubin at Haskins Laboratories in the 1970s. This program was subsequently used by Robert Remez, Philip Rubin, David Pisoni, and other colleagues to show that listeners can perceive continuous speech without traditional speech cues, i.e., pitch, stress, and intonation. This work paved the way for a view of speech as a dynamic pattern of trajectories through articulatory-acoustic space.

== Bibliography ==
- Rubin, P.E. Sinewave synthesis. Internal memorandum, Haskins Laboratories, New Haven, CT, 1980.
- Remez, R.E., Rubin, P.E., Pisoni, D.B., & Carrell, T.D. Speech perception without traditional speech cues. Science, 1981, 212, 947-950.
- Best, C.T., Morrongiello, B. & Robson, R. Perceptual equivalence of acoustic cues in speech and nonspeech perception. Perception & Psychophysics, 1981, 29, 191-211.
- Remez, R.E., Rubin, P.E., Berns, S.M., Pardo, J.S. & Lang, J.M. On the perceptual organization of speech. Psychological Review, 1994, 101, 129-156.
- Remez, R. E., Fellowes, J. M., & Rubin, P.E. Talker identification based on phonetic information. Journal of Experimental Psychology: Human Perception and Performance, 1997, 23, 651-666.
