= HADES (software) =

HADES (Haskins Analysis Display and Experiment System) refers to a family of signal processing computer programs that was developed in the 1980s at Haskins Laboratories by Philip Rubin and colleagues to provide for the display and analysis of multiple channel physiological, speech, and other sampled data in an experimental context. Principal programmers over the years on this project included Vance Maverick, Mark Tiede, Marian Pressler, and Simon Levy. The most significant feature of HADES was the incorporation of a procedural language known as SPIEL (Signal Processing Interactive Editing Language) that provided for the creation and customization of specialized analysis procedures that can be stored as text files, edited, etc., and are similar to functions and subroutines in programming languages like C and Fortran. HADES was one of the earliest signal processing systems with an integrated language and, through the use of SPIEL, provided for automated procedural analysis of large datasets, usually speech data or multiple-channel physiological data acquired with specialized hardware such as the EMMA magnetometer system. Previous systems at the time included ILS from STI, Inc., and the MITSYN system designed by Bill Henke. HADES was written in C and implemented on VAX systems running VMS. Although HADES still finds limited use, its functionality was eventually replaced by commercial systems such as MATLAB.

== Bibliography ==
- Rubin, Philip E. (1995). HADES: A Case Study of the Development of a Signal Processing System. In R. Bennett, S. L. Greenspan & A. Syrdal (Eds.), Behavioral Aspects of Speech Technology: Theory and Applications. CRC Press, Boca Raton, 501–520.
- Rubin, Philip E. and Löfqvist, Anders (1997). HADES (Haskins Analysis Display and Experiment System). Haskins Laboratories Technical Report, unpublished.
