= Robert Remez =

- Education: Brandeis University; University of Connecticut
- Scientific career
- Fields: Experiment psychology
- Workplaces: Columbia University

Robert Remez is an American experimental psychologist and cognitive scientist, and is Professor of Psychology at Barnard College, Columbia University and Chair of the Columbia University Seminar on Language & Cognition (founded in 2000). His teaching focuses on the relationships between cognition, perception and language. He is best known for his theoretical and experimental work on perceptual organization and speech perception.

With Carol Fowler, Philip Rubin, and Michael Turvey, he introduced the consideration of speech in terms of a dynamical systems/action theory perspective. With Rubin and various other colleagues, he has used the technique of sinewave synthesis as a unique tool for exploring perceptual organization. He is the co-editor, with David Pisoni, of the Handbook of Speech Perception. He was the Ann Olin Whitney Professor and former Chair of the Department of Psychology at Barnard College and is a member of the Board of Directors of Haskins Laboratories.

Remez is a graduate of Brandeis University and the University of Connecticut.

== Awards and honors ==
- Fellow, Acoustical Society of America
- Fellow, American Association for the Advancement of Science
- Fellow, American Psychological Association
- Fellow, Association for Psychological Science

== Selected publications ==
- Fowler, C. A., Rubin, P. E., Remez, R. E., & Turvey, M. T. (1980). Implications for speech production of a general theory of action. In B. Butterworth (Ed.), Language Production, Vol. I: Speech and Talk (pp. 373–420). New York: Academic Press.
- Remez, R. E.; Rubin, P. E.; Pisoni, D. B.; Carrell, T. D. (1981). "Speech perception without traditional speech cues". Science. 212 (4497): 947–950. Bibcode:1981Sci...212..947R. doi:10.1126/science.7233191. PMID 7233191. S2CID 13039853.
- Remez, R.E.; Rubin, P.E.; Berns, S.M.; Pardo, J.S.; Lang, J.M. (1994). "On the perceptual organization of speech". Psychological Review. 101 (1): 129–156. doi:10.1037/0033-295X.101.1.129. PMID 8121955.
- Remez, R. E. (1994). A guide to research on the perception of speech. In M. A. Gernsbacher (Ed.), Handbook of Psycholinguistics (pp. 145–172). New York: Academic Press.
- Remez, R. E.; Fellowes, J. M.; Rubin, P. E. (1997). "Talker identification based on phonetic information". Journal of Experimental Psychology: Human Perception and Performance. 23 (3): 651–666. doi:10.1037/0096-1523.23.3.651. PMID 9180039.
- Remez, R. E.; Pardo, J. S.; Piorkowski, R. L.; Rubin, P. E. (2001). "On the bistability of sinewave analogs of speech". Psychological Science. 12 (1): 24–29. doi:10.1111/1467-9280.00305. PMID 11294224. S2CID 22521260.
- Remez, R. E. (2005). The perceptual organization of speech. In D. B. Pisoni and R. E. Remez (Eds.), The Handbook of Speech Perception, (pp. 28–50). Oxford: Blackwell
