= Caryl Parker Haskins =

American scientist

Caryl Parker Haskins (1908–2001) was an American scientist, author, inventor, philanthropist, governmental adviser and pioneering entomologist in the study of ant biology. Along with Franklin S. Cooper, he founded the Haskins Laboratories, a private, non-profit research laboratory, in 1935. He was professor at Union College. He was also on the boards of non-profits such as the Carnegie Institution of Washington and the Smithsonian Institution.

== Career ==
Haskins was initially educated at Yale University, where he was awarded a B.S. degree in 1930. He went on to earn a Ph.D. from Harvard University in 1935. During his career, he was awarded an Sc.D. from multiple institutions.

Haskins taught at Union College as a research professor from 1937 to 1955. He was also a research associate at MIT from 1935 to 1945.

In the late 1940s, he began to study the evolution of guppies in the streams of Trinidad. He found that male guppies in stream ponds further upstream were more colorful than those downstream, presumably because of fewer predators there.

He also continued his research on entomology, working with his wife, Edna Haskins (whom he married in 1940), and other colleagues.

=== Haskins Laboratories ===
In the 1930s, Haskins was inspired by Alfred Lee Loomis to establish his own research facility. He founded Haskins Laboratories in 1935. Affiliated with Harvard University, MIT and Union College, Haskins conducted research in microbiology, radiation physics and other fields in Cambridge, Massachusetts, and in Schenectady, New York. In 1939, Haskins Laboratories moved its center to New York City. Seymour Hutner joined the staff to set up a research program in microbiology, genetics and nutrition; the descendant of this program is now part of Pace University in New York. In the 1940s, Luigi Provasoli joined the Laboratories to set up a research program in marine biology, which disbanded with his retirement in 1978. Since the 1950s, the main focus of the research of Haskins Laboratories has been on speech and its biological basis. The main facility of Haskins Laboratories moved to New Haven, Connecticut, in 1970 where it entered into affiliation agreements with Yale University and the University of Connecticut. Haskins Laboratories continues to be a leading, multidisciplinary laboratory with an international scope that does pioneering work on the science of the spoken and written word.

Haskins served as president, research director, and chairman of the board of Haskins Laboratories from 1935 to 1987.

=== Public service ===
During World War II, Haskins used his scientific knowledge for the war effort. He was a liaison officer with the Office of Scientific Research and Development (OSRD) and then worked with the chairman of the National Defense Research Committee. After the war, he advised the Research and Development Board of the Army and the Navy, the Secretary of Defense, and the Secretary of State; he was also a member of the President's Science Advisory Committee.

Haskins was elected to the American Academy of Arts and Sciences in 1951 and the American Philosophical Society in 1955.

In 1956, he was elected to the United States National Academy of Sciences. That same year, he was appointed to the Presidency of the Carnegie Institution of Washington, a position he held until 1971.

Haskins served as a Regent of the Smithsonian Institution from 1956 to 1980. He also chaired the Regents' Executive Committee from 1968 to 1972. In 1980, the Board of Regents unanimously awarded him the Henry Medal "in recognition of his manifold services to the Institution as a friend and a Regent".

He was active with the National Geographic Society in many positions: Trustee from 1964 to 1984 (and then honorary trustee), member of the Finance Committee from 1972 to 1985, member of the Committee on Research and Exploration beginning in 1972, and member of the Society's executive committee from 1972 to 1984.

He was a director of E.I. du Pont de Nemours from 1971 to 1981.

He was president of the Sigma Xi scientific research honor society in 1967–68. He remained a trustee of Carnegie Institution and of Haskins Laboratories, as well as trustee emeritus of the National Geographic Society, until his death.

== Publications by or about Caryl Parker Haskins ==
- Philip Abelson. "A Model for Excellence". In J. D. Ebert (ed.), This Our Golden Age, 3–10.
- Alice B. Dadourian. "A Bio-Bibliography of Caryl Parker Haskins". Yvonix, New Haven, Connecticut, 2000.
- James D. Ebert, editor. This Our Golden Age: Selected Annual Essays of Caryl P. Haskins, President Carnegie Institution of Washington 1956-1971. Carnegie Institution of Washington, Washington, DC, 1994. LC # 94–70734.
- James D. Ebert. "Inspiring Mentor, Visionary Leader". In J. D. Ebert (ed.), This Our Golden Age, 19–24.
- George Orwell: "Review of Ants and Men by Carol P. Haskins". In: George Orwell. Essays. Everyman Library. 242. Edited by Alfred A. Knopf. 2002, pp 1077. ISBN 978-1-85715-242-5.
- Caryl Parker Haskins. Of ants and men. Prentice-Hall, New York, 1939.
- Caryl Parker Haskins. Of Societies and Men. W.W. Norton, New York, 1951.
- Caryl Parker Haskins. The scientific revolution and world politics. Greenwood Press, 1975.
- Haskins, C. P. and Haskins, "Edna F. Notes on the biology and social behavior of the archaic ponerine ants of the genera Myrmecia and Promyrmecia". Annals of the Entomological Society of America, 1950, 43(4), 461–491.
- Edward O. Wilson. "Caryl Haskins, Entomologist". In J. D. Ebert (ed.), This Our Golden Age, 11–18.
