= Asilomar =

Asilomar can refer to a number of things:

- Asilomar State Beach, a state park unit on the Monterey Peninsula in California
  - Asilomar Conference Grounds, a conference center at "Asilomar State Beach and Conference Grounds"
    - Asilomar Conference on Recombinant DNA, an influential conference on the regulation of biotechnology held at the Asilomar Conference Grounds in 1975
    - Asilomar Microcomputer Workshop, formerly named IEEE Workshop on Microprocessors
    - Asilomar International Conference on Climate Intervention Technologies, a conference on the regulation of climate engineering held at the Asilomar Conference Grounds in March 2010
    - Asilomar Conference on Beneficial AI, held at the Asilomar Conference Grounds in January 2017
