= James D. Ebert =

American biologist and administrator

James David Ebert (December 11, 1921 – May 22, 2001) was an American biologist and administrator.

== Career ==
Ebert was trained at Johns Hopkins University as a PhD embryologist and came into embryology at the end of the era of descriptive embryology. His own studies of the chick embryo culminated in the book "Interacting Systems in Development", which was published in six languages. As Director of the Department of Embryology of The Carnegie Institution of Washington located on the Baltimore Hopkins campus, he pushed the institution out of the age of specimen collecting into the modern era of genetic research. His most important contribution to embryology was in his early investigation of the "graft-host" reaction. This seminal work would comprise the first blocks in the foundation for the modern medical industry of organ transplants and set the stage for stem cell research. During his long career he was a professor at Indiana University, MIT, Johns Hopkins University, a Vice President of The National Academy of Sciences, a member of the American Academy of Arts and Sciences, a member of the American Philosophical Society, President of the Carnegie Institution of Washington (1978–1987), and President and Director of The Marine Biological Laboratory in Woods Hole, Massachusetts where he and his wife Alma had remained in some capacity for over fifty years. At one time or another he headed or sat on the board of nearly every organization that contributed to developmental biology. His interests were not limited to biology, however. In 2000, on his 79th birthday, he attended the grand opening or "First Light" celebration of the Magellan Telescopes of The Las Campanas Observatory in Chile, which began construction while he was President of the Carnegie Institution.

Since 2013, Ebert has been listed on the Advisory Council of the National Center for Science Education.

Ebert and his wife were killed in a traffic accident on Interstate 95 northeast of Baltimore, Maryland.
