= Ann Syrdal =

American psychologist and researcher (1945–2020)

- Born: December 13, 1945; Minneapolis
- Died: July 24, 2020 (aged 74); San Jose, California
- Education: University of Minneapolis
- Occupations: Psychologist, computer science researcher
- Known for: Female-voiced speech synthesis
- Children: 3

Ann Kristen Syrdal (December 13, 1945 – July 24, 2020) was an American psychologist and computer science researcher who worked with speech synthesis technology. She developed the first female-sounding voice synthesizer.

== Early life ==
Syrdal was born on December 13, 1945, in Minneapolis. Her father, Richard, was a physicist and engineer; her mother, Marjorie (née Paulson) was a sales clerk. She was raised by her mother after her father died when she was two years old.

== Career ==
Syrdal became interested in psychology after helping with laboratory experiments involving rats. Subsequently, she completed a Bachelor's degree and then received a PhD degree in psychology from the University of Minnesota (Minneapolis) in 1973. Ann's psychology degree had a focus on human speech perception.

After receiving her PhD, she began research work at the University of Texas at Dallas's Callier Center for Communication Disorders. In the early 1980s she received a five-year grant from the National Institutes of Health, and began studying the mechanics of human speech at Stockholm's KTH Royal Institute of Technology and the Massachusetts Institute of Technology.

After the grant ended, Syrdal took a job at AT&T Bell Laboratories. At the time, synthesized voices were primarily male. In 1990 she developed a system that could generate a female voice. In the 1990s she joined a project that developed a new method of speech synthesis, focusing on pitch and intonation; instead of creating the sounds artificially, the synthesis joined fragments of recorded speech to create new words and sentences. Syrdal oversaw the initial recordings, of six women's voices. In 1998, AT&T's "Natural Voices" system won an international competition for speech synthesizers, using a female voice. Syrdal and other scholars in the field considered the lack of variety and research in female-sounding synthesized voices as a kind of technosexism.

In 1998, her team at Bell Laboratories won an international competition for their project called Julia, which could be considered by some experts as the first synthesized voice that sounded like a woman, of a high quality.

She was named a fellow of the Acoustical Society of America in 2008, for her work in female speech synthesis.

Syrdal died of cancer on July 24, 2020, in San Jose, California.

== Personal life ==
Syrdal married and divorced three times; at the time of her death she had been in a domestic partnership for 23 years. She had three children, a son; Sean O'Malley and two daughters; Kristen Lasky and Barbara Evelyn Lasky.

== Accomplishments ==
Ann's Career was so prominent she was honored by being made an "Acoustical Society of America Fellow".
