= Alvin Liberman =

American linguist (1917–2000)

- Born: May 10, 1917; St. Joseph, Missouri
- Died: January 13, 2000 (aged 82); Mansfield, Connecticut
- Occupation: Psychologist

Alvin Meyer Liberman (/ˈlɪbərmən/; May 10, 1917 – January 13, 2000) was born in St. Joseph, Missouri. Liberman was an American psychologist. His ideas set the agenda for fifty years of psychological research in speech perception.

== Biography ==
Liberman received his B.A. degree from the University of Missouri in Columbia, Missouri in 1938, his M.A. degree from the University of Missouri in 1939 and his Ph.D. in psychology from Yale University in 1942. His ideas set the agenda for fifty years of research in the psychology of speech perception and laid the groundwork for modern computer speech synthesis and the understanding of critical issues in cognitive science. He took a biological perspective on language and his 'nativist' approach was often controversial as well as influential. He was a professor of psychology at the University of Connecticut and of linguistics at Yale University as well as president of Haskins Laboratories from 1975 through 1986. Liberman had a distinctive goal in mind. In order to reach this goal, he developed a project where he was to produce the sound output of a reading machine for the blind, a device that could scan, print, and produce a selective acoustic pattern for every component of the English alphabet. His paper on the "Perception of the Speech Code" in 1967 remains one of the most cited papers in the psychological literature. He is also known for his pioneering work with Dr. Franklin S. Cooper on the development of the reading machine for the blind in 1944. He is also known for the development of the motor theory of speech perception with Ignatius Mattingly in the 1960s and 1970s. Along with his wife, Isabelle Liberman, he elucidated the "alphabetic principle" and its relationship to phonemic awareness and phonological awareness in reading. He was a member of the National Academies of Science and of many other distinguished scientific societies. After retiring，Al remained an active, influential presence in the international scientific community. His publication record, which began in 1944 with an article in the Journal of Experimental Psychology, ended in 2000 with an article, coauthored with Douglas Whalen of Haskins Laboratories，in Trends in Cognitive Sciences. Liberman continued giving well-received speeches and presentations and continued to act as a catalyst for research at various institutes such as the Brain Research Laboratory at the University of Technology in Finland. He received an award from the Finnish Academy of Sciences, the last of his many accolades. On January 13, 2000, Alvin Liberman died due to problems that occurred after heart surgery.

His son Mark Liberman is Trustee Professor of Phonetics and director of the Institute for Research and Cognitive Science at the University of Pennsylvania. His son M. Charles Liberman is Professor of Otology and Laryngology at Harvard Medical School. His daughter, Sarah Ash, is an Associate Professor of Nutrition in the Department of Food, Bioprocessing, and Nutrition Sciences at North Carolina State University; as well as nine grandchildren that follow his lineage.

== Research ==
Liberman was one of the first to conduct research and experimental studies in the field of speech development and linguistics. Through his research he aimed to gain a thorough understanding of the importance and purpose of speech in the act of reading and the process of learning to read. Some of his profound investigations were made during his time at Haskins Laboratories where he worked as a research scientist trying to investigate the relationships between speech and acoustics. From his research he came up with the idea that we hear spoken words much differently than sounds. It was evident to Liberman that speech, the speed at which someone says something in particular, is connected to the word's amount of syllables, or in other terms its "acoustic complexity" (Whalen, 2000). The difference in the difficulty of speech and reading exists even as alphabetic writing systems provide discrete and invariant signals and nods to vowels, sounds and consonants. When it comes to speech and conversation, it "does not come to us as a series of individual words; we must extract the words from a stream of speech." Liberman and his colleagues were training the blind to read using a reading machine that would replace each letter of the alphabet with a specific sound. However, he and his colleagues found that the replacement of the sounds for each distinct letter of the alphabet did not help with the blind to learn to read or pronounce the letters fluently. After long investigations of why this was, Liberman established that speech was not as simple as an acoustic alphabet. Therefore, speech signals are very distinct from acoustic alphabet (Fowler, 2001). These investigations showed that speech perception is different from perception of other acoustic signals, and convinced Liberman that speech perception is the result of the human biological adaptations to language. Human listeners are able to decode the repetitive variable signal of running speech and to translate it into phonemic components. This is also known as the "motor theory of speech perception". Liberman ascribed this to the human biological disposition towards speech as opposed to reading which is not ingrained genetically.

In one of his articles, Liberman mentioned speech production is easy to create as it relies on the "conscious awareness of phonological structure". He disagreed with "horizontal theory" because it would imply that the "advantage of ease" would be dependent upon reading and writing, not speech. Liberman also argued that reading alphabets is not important to speech until one learns the phonological pattern of speech. He made mention that speech itself is not only attributed to biological evolution, rather it is also species specific.

Liberman also examined why reading is more difficult than speech perception. He attributed this greater difficulty to the human biological adaptation to speech. Liberman discovered that children who fail to learn to read on schedule lack phonemic awareness. Phonemic awareness is an awareness that word forms breaks down into individual parts. This is because they cannot appreciate the alphabetic principle.

== Bibliography ==
- Cooper, F. S.; Liberman, A. M.; Borst, J. M. (1951). "The interconversion of audible and visible patterns as a basis for research on the perception of speech". Proceedings of the National Academy of Sciences. 37 (5): 318–325. Bibcode:1951PNAS...37..318C. doi:10.1073/pnas.37.5.318. PMC 1063363. PMID 14834156.
- Carol A. Fowler, C.A. (2001). Alvin M. Liberman (1917–2000), Obituaries. American Psychologist Dec. 2001, Vol. 56, No. 12, 1164–1165
- James F. Kavanagh and Ignatius G. Mattingly (eds.), Language by Ear and by Eye: The Relationships between Speech and Reading. The MIT Press, Cambridge, Massachusetts: 1972. (Paperback edition, 1974, ISBN 0-262-61015-9).
- Liberman, A. M. (1957). "Some results of research on speech perception". Journal of the Acoustical Society of America. 29 (1): 117–123. Bibcode:1957ASAJ...29..117L. doi:10.1121/1.1908635. hdl:11858/00-001M-0000-002C-5789-A.
- Liberman, A. M.; Ingemann, F.; Lisker, L.; Delattre, P. C.; Cooper, F. S. (1959). "Minimal rules for synthesizing speech". Journal of the Acoustical Society of America. 31 (11): 1490–1499. Bibcode:1959ASAJ...31.1490L. doi:10.1121/1.1907654.
- Liberman, A. M.; Cooper, F. S.; Shankweiler, D. P.; Studdert-Kennedy, M. (1967). "Perception of the speech code". Psychological Review. 74 (6): 431–461. doi:10.1037/h0020279. PMID 4170865.
- Liberman, A. M.; Mattingly, I. G. (1985). "The motor theory of speech perception revised". Cognition. 21 (1): 1–36. doi:10.1016/0010-0277(85)90021-6. PMID 4075760. S2CID 112932.
- Liberman, I. Y., Shankweiler, D., & Liberman, A. M. (1989). The alphabetic principle and learning to read. In D. Shankweiler & I. Y. Liberman (Eds.), Phonology and Reading Disability: Solving the Reading Puzzle. Research Monograph Series. Ann Arbor: University of Michigan Press.
- Alvin M. Liberman. Speech: a special code. The MIT Press, Cambridge, Massachusetts: 1996. (Hardcover, ISBN 0262121921_
- Ignatius G. Mattingly & Michael Studdert-Kennedy (Eds.), Modularity and the Motor Theory of Speech Perception: Proceedings of a Conference to Honor Alvin M. Liberman. Hillsdale, New Jersey: Lawrence Erlbaum: 1991. (Paperback, ISBN 0-8058-0331-9)
- Fowler, Carol A. "Alvin M. Liberman (1917-2000), Obituaries". American Psychologist. 2001: 1164–1165. doi:10.1037/0003-066x.56.12.1164.
- Stevens, K. N.; Liberman, A. M.; Ohman, S. E. G.; Studdert-Kennedy, M. (1969). "Cross-language study of vowel perception". Language and Speech. 12 (1): 1–23. doi:10.1177/002383096901200101. PMID 5789292. S2CID 41151516.
- Mattingly, I. G. & A. M. Liberman. (1970). The speech code and the physiology of language. In: Information Processing in the Nervous System, K.N. Leibovic, Ed. (pp. 97–117). Springer Verlag.

== Honors ==
- National Academy of Sciences
- 1988 F. O. Schmitt Medal and Prize in Neuroscience
- Distinguished Scientific Contribution Award, American Psychological Association, 1980
- American Academy of Arts and Sciences
- Warren Medal, Society of Experimental Psychologists
- Docteur Honoris Causa, Universite Libre de Bruxelles
- Honorary Doctor of Science Degree, Binghamton University, New York
- University of Connecticut Alumni Association Award for Excellence in Research
- University of Connecticut Alumni Association Distinguished Professor
- Fellow, Center for Advanced Study in the Behavioral Sciences, 1964–65
- Fellow, Acoustical Society of America
- Fellow, American Psychological Association
- Guggenheim Fellow, 1964–65
- Medal, Collège de France
