= Carol Fowler =

American psychologist

Carol Ann Fowler is an American experimental psychologist. She was president and director of research at Haskins Laboratories in New Haven, Connecticut from 1992 to 2008. She is also a professor of psychology at the University of Connecticut and adjunct professor of linguistics and psychology at Yale University. She received her undergraduate degree from Brown University in 1971, her M.A University of Connecticut in 1973 and her Ph.D. in psychology from the University of Connecticut in 1977.

She is best known for her direct realist approach to speech perception. She has also done extensive research on the relationship between speech perception and speech production, and on imitation. Fowler researched cross-language influences on speech production in the two languages of native bilingual speakers Specifically, the voiceless voice-onset times (VOTs) of bilingual speakers of English and French in Montreal were longer in their French speech and shorter in their English speech than the VOTs of monolingual speakers of the two languages in Montreal. In 2016, the journal Ecological Psychology published in two parts a collection of papers in honor of her contribution to the field.

== Selected publications ==
- Fowler, C. A., Rubin, P. E., Remez, R. E., & Turvey, M. T. (1980). Implications for speech production of a general theory of action. In B. Butterworth (Ed.), Language Production, Vol. I: Speech and Talk (pp. 373–420). New York: Academic Press.
- Fowler, C. A., Galantucci, B. and Saltzman, E. (2003). Motor theories of perception. In M. Arbib (Ed.) The handbook of brain theory and neural networks. (pp. 705–707) Cambridge MA: MIT Press.
- Fowler, C. A. (2003). Speech production and perception. In A. Healy and R. Proctor (eds.). Handbook of psychology, Vol. 4: Experimental Psychology. (pp. 237–266) New York: John Wiley & Sons.
- Nye, P.; Fowler, C. A. (2003). "Shadowing latency and imitation: The effect of familiarity with the phonetic patterning of English". Journal of Phonetics. 31: 63–79. doi:10.1016/S0095-4470(02)00072-4.
- Goldstein, L. and Fowler, C. A. (2003). Articulatory phonology: A phonology for public language use. In N. O. Schiller and A. Meyer (eds) Phonetics and Phonology in Language Comprehension and Production: Differences and Similarities. (pp. 159–207) Berlin: Mouton de Gruyter.
- Galantucci, B; Fowler, C.A.; Turvey, M.T. (2006). "The motor theory of speech perception reviewed". Psychonomic Bulletin and Review. 13 (3): 361–377. doi:10.3758/bf03193857. PMC 2746041. PMID 17048719.
- Brady, S., Braze, D., & Fowler, C. A. (Eds.). (2011). "Explaining individual differences in reading: Theory and evidence". New York: Psychology Press.
- Fowler, C. A. (2011). How theories of phonology may enhance understanding of the role of phonology in reading development and reading disability. In S. A. Brady, D. Braze & C. A. Fowler (Eds.), "Explaining individual differences in reading: Theory and evidence". New York: Psychology Press.
