= Vocal tract =

Sound-making organs in animals

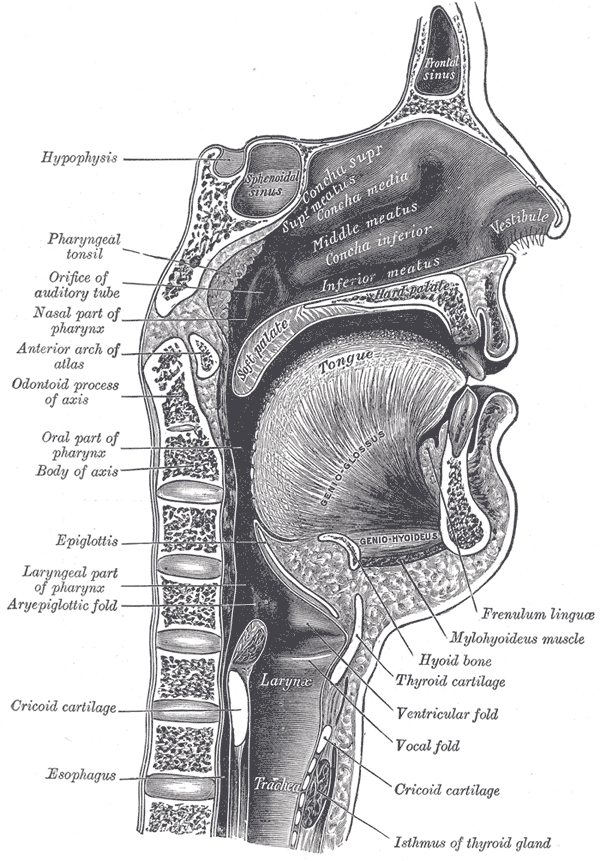
- Sagittal section of human vocal tract

The vocal tract or speech apparatus is the cavity in mammals and in birds where the sound produced at the sound source (larynx in mammals; syrinx in birds) is filtered.

In mammals, it consists of the laryngeal cavity, the pharynx, the oral cavity, and the nasal cavity. In birds, it consists of the trachea, the syrinx, the oral cavity, the upper part of the esophagus, and the beak.

The estimated average length of the vocal tract in men is 16.9 cm and 14.1 cm in women.

Vocal tract length is an important determinant of voice resonance. A shorter vocal tract generally produces higher formant frequencies, while a longer vocal tract produces lower formants.

== See also ==
- Language
- Talking birds – species of birds capable of imitating human sounds, but without known comprehension
- Speech organ
- Speech synthesis
- Manner of articulation
