= Saʼban language =

Apo Duat language spoken in Borneo

Saʼban
- Region: Sarawak (Malaysia)
- Native speakers: (2,000 cited 2000)
- Language family: Austronesian: Malayo-Polynesian; North Bornean; North Sarawakan; Apo Duat; Saʼban

Language codes
- ISO 639-3: snv
- Glottolog: saba1265

Saʼban is one of the remoter languages of Borneo, on the Sarawak–Kalimantan border. The language is known as hmeu Saʼban in the Saʼban language.

== Classification ==
Saʼban is a member of the Apo Duat subgroup of languages, which also includes Kelabit, Lun Bawang/Lundayeh and Tring. Collectively, they belong to the North Sarawak subgroup of the Austronesian family. Today, the Saʼban people live in Long Peluan, Long Banga' and Long Balong in Sarawak, Malaysia. There are also Saʼban groups in Kalimantan, Indonesia.

== Phonology ==
The Saʼban language has several sounds that are rare among the world's languages. These include voiceless nasal and liquid consonants and a distinction between long and short vowels as well as long and short consonants. Some examples of words with voiceless nasals and liquids are given in the table below. They have a stative reading in contrast to long consonants:

Voiceless Nasals and Liquids in Saʼban
	Voiceless Continuant (Stative)	Long Consonant (Transitive)
⟨ɹ̥⟩	/hraək/ [ɹ̥ɹa:k] 'torn'	/rraək/ [ɹa:k] 'to tear'
⟨ɬ⟩	/hləu/ [ɬləu] 'correct'	/lləu/ [ləu] 'to steer'
⟨n̥⟩	/hnau/ [n̥nʌu] 'opinion'	/nnau/ [nʌu] 'to think'

== Bibliography ==
- Blust, Robert A. (1997-01-01). "Ablaut in Northwest Borneo". Diachronica. 14 (1): 1–30. doi:10.1075/dia.14.1.02blu. ISSN 0176-4225.
- Blust, Robert (2001). "Language, Dialect and Riotous Sound Change: The case of Saʼban." In Graham W. Thurgood (ed.) Papers from the Ninth Annual Meeting of the Southeast Asian Linguistics Society, 249–359. Tempe: Arizona State University.
- Clayre, Beatrice (1972). "A preliminary comparative study of the Lun Bawang (Murut) and Saʼban languages of Sarawak." Sarawak Museum Journal 20: 40-41, 45-47.
- Clayre, Beatrice (1994). "Saʼban: a case of language change." In Peter W. Martin (ed) Shifting Patterns of Language Use in Borneo, 209-226. Williamsburg VA: Borneo Research Council.
- Clayre, Beatrice (2005). "Kelabitic languages and the fate of 'focus': evidence from the Kerayan." In I Wayan Arka & Malcolm Ross (eds.) The many faces of Austronesian voice systems: some new empirical studies, 17-57. Canberra: Pacific Linguistics.
- Clayre, Beatrice (2014). "A preliminary typology of the languages of Middle Borneo." In Peter Sercombe, Michael Boutin & Adrian Clynes (eds.) Advances in research on cultural and linguistic practices in Borneo, 123-151. Phillips, Maine USA: Borneo Research Council.
- Clayre, I. F. C. S. (1973). "The Phonemes of Saʼban: A Language of Highland Borneo". Linguistics. 11 (100). doi:10.1515/ling.1973.11.100.26. ISSN 1613-396X. S2CID 144279499.
- Omar, Asmah Haji (1983). The Malay Peoples of Malaysia and Their Languages. Kuala Lumpur: Art Printing Works.
