= Kelabit =

Kelabit may refer to:

- Kelabit people, an indigenous tribe in the interior of Sarawak, Malaysia
- Kelabit language, the language of the Kelabit people
- Kelabit Highlands, a mountain range in Sarawak, Malaysia
- Kelabitic languages also known as Apo Duat languages, spoken mainly by Lun Bawang, Kelabit people in Sarawak and Lundayeh in Sabah, Malaysia
