= Voice onset time =

Feature of the production of stop consonants

A graphical representation of the VOT of voiced, tenuis, and aspirated stops. The waves represent voicing, or the vibration of the vocal cords. The double-ended fork represents the relative positions of the articulators involved.

In phonetics, voice onset time (VOT) is a feature of the production of stop consonants. It is defined as the length of time that passes between the release of a stop consonant and the onset of voicing, the vibration of the vocal folds, or, according to other authors, periodicity. Some authors allow negative values to mark voicing that begins during the period of articulatory closure for the consonant and continues in the release, for those unaspirated voiced stops in which there is no voicing present at the instant of articulatory closure.

== History ==
The concept of voice onset time can be traced back as far as the 19th century, when Adjarian (1899: 119) studied the Armenian stops and characterized them by "the relation that exists between two moments: the one when the consonant bursts when the air is released out of the mouth, or explosion, and the one when the larynx starts vibrating". However, the concept became widely known only in the 1960s, in a context described by Lin & Wang (2011: 514): "At that time, there was an ongoing debate about which phonetic attribute would allow voiced and voiceless stops to be effectively distinguished. For instance, voicing, aspiration, and articulatory force were some of the attributes being studied regularly. In English, voicing can successfully separate /b, d, ɡ/ from /p, t, k/ when stops are at word-medial positions, but this is not always true for word-initial stops. Strictly speaking, word-initial voiced stops /b, d, ɡ/ are only partially voiced, and sometimes are even voiceless." The concept of VOT finally acquired its name in the famous study of Leigh Lisker and Arthur Abramson (Word, 1964), done while working together at Haskins Laboratories.

== Analytic problems ==
A number of problems arose in defining VOT in some languages, and there is a call for reconsidering whether this speech synthesis parameter should be used to replace articulatory or aerodynamic model parameters which do not have these problems, and which have a stronger explanatory significance. As in the discussion below, any explication of VOT variations will invariably lead back to such aerodynamic and articulatory concepts, and there is no reason presented why VOT adds to an analysis, other than that, as an acoustic parameter, it may sometimes be easier to measure than an aerodynamic parameter (pressure or airflow) or an articulatory parameter (closure interval or the duration, extent and timing of a vocal fold abductory gesture).

== Types ==
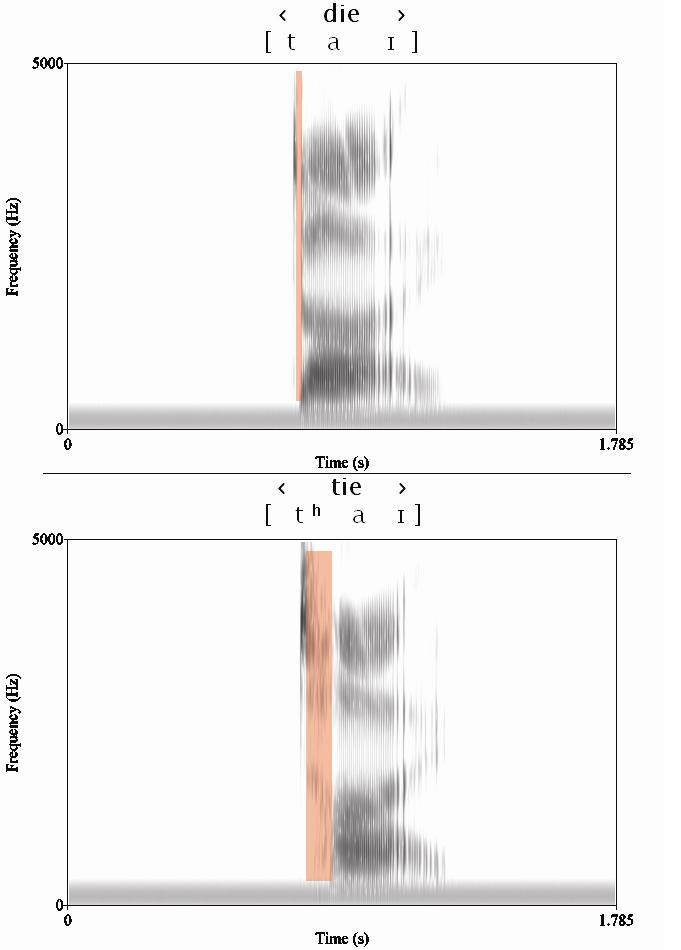
Voice onset timing spectrograms for English "die" and "tie". The voiceless gap between release and voicing is highlighted in red. Here the phoneme /t/ has a VOT of 95 ms, and /d/ has one of 25 ms.

Three major phonation types of stops can be analyzed in terms of their voice onset time.

- Simple unaspirated voiceless stops, sometimes called "tenuis" stops, have a voice onset time at or near zero, meaning that the voicing of a following sonorant (such as a vowel) begins at or near to when the stop is released. (An offset of 15 ms or less on [t] and 30 ms or less on [k] is inaudible and counts as tenuis.)
- Aspirated stops followed by a sonorant have a voice onset time greater than this amount, called a positive VOT. The length of the VOT in such cases is a practical measure of aspiration: The longer the VOT, the stronger the aspiration. In Navajo, for example, which is strongly aspirated, the aspiration (and therefore the VOT) lasts twice as long as it does in English: 160ms vs. 80ms for [kʰ], and 45ms for [k]. Some languages have weaker aspiration than English. For velar stops, tenuis [k] typically has a VOT of 20-30 ms, weakly aspirated [k] of some 50-60 ms, moderately aspirated [kʰ] averages 80–90 ms, and anything much over 100 ms would be considered strong aspiration. The bilabial and alveolar sounds are different. An offset of 15 ms or less on [t] and 30 ms or less on [k] is inaudible, and counts as tenuis, while tenuis [p] is only single-digit VOT, with the 20-30 ms range (that is tenuis for [k]) is considered mild aspiration. (Another phonation, breathy voice, is commonly called voiced aspiration; in order for the VOT measure to apply to it, VOT needs to be understood as the onset of modal voicing. Of course, an aspirated consonant will not always be followed by a voiced sound, in which case VOT cannot be used to measure it.)
- Voiced stops have a voice onset time noticeably less than zero, a "negative VOT", meaning the vocal cords start vibrating before the stop is released. With a "fully voiced stop", the VOT coincides with the onset of the stop; with a "partially voiced stop", such as English [b, d, ɡ] in initial position, voicing begins sometime during the closure (occlusion) of the consonant.

Because neither aspiration nor voicing is absolute, with intermediate degrees of both, the relative terms fortis and lenis are often used to describe a binary opposition between a series of consonants with higher (more positive) VOT, defined as fortis, and a second series with lower (more negative) VOT, defined as lenis. Of course, being relative, what fortis and lenis mean in one language will not in general correspond to what they mean in another.

Voicing contrast applies to all types of consonants, but aspiration is generally only a feature of stops and affricates.

There are also mixed-voiced consonants which start off as voiced but is released as either tenuis, aspirated or as ejectives like in Juǀʼhoansi and Kelabit, Lun Bawang contrasts them with plain voiced and voicelesses like /p, b, b͡p/.

== Transcription ==
Aspiration may be transcribed ⟨◌ʰ⟩, long (strong) aspiration ⟨◌ʰʰ⟩. Voicing is most commonly indicated by the choice of consonant letter. For one way of transcribing pre-voicing and other timing variants, see extensions to the IPA § Diacritics. Other systems include that of Laver (1994), who distinguishes fully devoiced ⟨b̥a⟩ and ⟨ab̥⟩ from initial partial devoicing of the onset of a syllable by ⟨˳ba⟩ and from final partial devoicing of the coda of a syllable by ⟨ab˳⟩.

== Examples in languages ==
Relative VOT distinctions in various languages
	Voice Onset Time	Examples							
	Voice Onset Time	English	Cantonese	Tlingit	Navajo	Korean	Japanese, Polish, Canadian French	Spanish, Russian, European French	Thai, Armenian
(fortis)	Strong aspiration			Yes	Yes	Yes			
↑	Moderate aspiration	Yes	Yes						Yes
	Mild aspiration				Yes	Yes	Yes		
	Tenuis		Yes	Yes		Yes		Yes	Yes
↓	Partially voiced	Yes							
(lenis)	Fully voiced						Yes	Yes	Yes

== Publications ==
- Abramson, Arthur S.; Lisker, Leigh (January 1973). "Voice-timing perception in Spanish word-initial stops". Journal of Phonetics. 1 (1): 1–8. doi:10.1016/S0095-4470(19)31372-5.
- Abramson, Arthur S.; Whalen, D.H. (July 2017). "Voice Onset Time (VOT) at 50: Theoretical and practical issues in measuring voicing distinctions". Journal of Phonetics. 63: 75–86. doi:10.1016/j.wocn.2017.05.002. PMC 5665574. PMID 29104329.
- Allen, J. Sean; Miller, Joanne L.; DeSteno, David (2003). "Individual talker differences in voice-onset-time". The Journal of the Acoustical Society of America. 113 (1): 544–552. doi:10.1121/1.1528172. PMID 12558290.
- Cho, Taehong; Ladefoged, Peter (1999). "Variation and universals in VOT: Evidence from 18 languages". Journal of Phonetics. 27 (2): 207–229. doi:10.1006/jpho.1999.0094.
- Cho, Taehong; Whalen, D.H.; Docherty, Gerard (2019). "Voice onset time and beyond: Exploring laryngeal contrast in 19 languages". Journal of Phonetics. 72: 52–65. doi:10.1016/j.wocn.2018.11.002. PMC 6768074. PMID 31571702.
- Itoh, Motonobu; Sasanuma, Sumiko; Tatsumi, Itaru F.; Murakami, Shuko; Fukusako, Yoko; Suzuki, Tsutomu (November 1982). "Voice onset time characteristics in apraxia of speech". Brain and Language. 17 (2): 193–210. doi:10.1016/0093-934X(82)90016-5. PMID 7159832.
- Kessinger, R.H.; Blumstein, S.E. (April 1997). "Effects of speaking rate on voice-onset time in Thai, French, and English". Journal of Phonetics. 25 (2): 143–168. doi:10.1006/jpho.1996.0039.
- Lisker, Leigh; Abramson, Arthur S. (1964). "A Cross-Language Study of Voicing in Initial Stops: Acoustical Measurements". Word. 20 (3): 384–422. doi:10.1080/00437956.1964.11659830.
- Rubin, Philip (2022). "Arthur Abramson". Oxford Research Encyclopedia of Linguistics. doi:10.1093/acrefore/9780199384655.013.923. ISBN 978-0-19-785146-3.
- Scobbie, James M. (2006). "Flexibility in the face incompatible English VOT systems". Laboratory Phonology 8. pp. 367–392. doi:10.1515/9783110197211.2.367. hdl:20.500.12289/2146. ISBN 978-3-11-017678-0.
- Winn, Matthew B. (February 2020). "Manipulation of voice onset time in speech stimuli: A tutorial and flexible Praat script". The Journal of the Acoustical Society of America. 147 (2): 852–866. doi:10.1121/10.0000692. PMID 32113256.

== Sources ==
- Cho, Taehong; Ladefoged, Peter (1999). "Variation and universals in VOT: Evidence from 18 languages". Journal of Phonetics. 27 (2): 207–229. doi:10.1006/jpho.1999.0094.
- Braun, Angelika (1983). "VOT im 19. Jahrhundert oder «Die Wiederkehr des Gleichen»". Phonetica. 40 (4): 323–327. doi:10.1159/000261699.
