= Beatrice Blance =

British archaeologist (born 1933)

Beatrice Blance, also known by her married name Beatrice Clayre (born November 22, 1933), is a British archaeologist, ethnographer, and philologist whose research has focused primarily on the Early Bronze Age, urban archaeology and endangered languages.

== Career ==
Based on the results from her PhD, she published two articles in 1961 and in 1964, drawing a connection between the development of the first Bronze Age in the southwest part of the peninsula with the late Calcolitic facies corresponding to the late Beaker phase, and she named this phase "El Argar A".

She then abandoned the archaeological research to pursue other interests. Between 1964 and 1968, she lived in Sabah and Sarawak, and studied the Dusun, Lun Bawang, Penan, Kayan and Sa'ban languages. In 2014, she received a grant to compile a Sa'ban-English dictionary and to collect and translate texts on history, customs and folk stories.

She came back to the archaeological research in the 1970s when she was invited to join one of the first projects focusing on Urban Archaeology in Winchester with the team led by Martin Biddle. Since the seventies, she has taken part in excavations such as Fuente Alamo and conferences in Spain and Portugal. In 1998, she received 'homage' (homenaje) from the University of Seville for her contribution to Spanish archaeology.

== Published works ==
- Blance, B. 1959. Estudio espectrográfico de algunos objetos metálicos del Museo de Prehistoria de la Diputación de Valencia. Archivo de Prehistoria Levantina VIII: 163-174.
- Blance, B. 1961. Early Bronze Age Colonists in Iberia. Antiquity 35: 192-202.
- Blance, B. 1964. The Argaric Bronze Age in Iberia. Revista de Guimarães 74: 129-142.
- Blance, B. 1971. Die Anfange der Metallurgie auf der Iberischen Halbinsel. Studien der Anfänge der Metallurgie (SAM), 4. Berlin: Mann.
- Clayre, B. 1972. A preliminary study of the Lun Bawang (Murut) and Sa'ban languages of Sarawak. Sarawak Museum Journal, XX(40-41), 145-171.
- Blance, B. 1986. Siret y cien años de arqueología. Homenaje a Luis Siret (1934–1984): 19–27. Sevilla: Junta de Andalucía
- Clayre, B. 1994. Sa’ban: A case of language change. In P.W. Martin (Ed.) Shifting patterns of language use in Borneo (pp. 209–226). Borneo Research Council.
- Blance, B. 1995. Copper age colonies seen from the eighties. Orígens, Estruturas e Relações das Culturas Calcolíticas da Peninsula Ibérica: Actas das I Jornadas Arqueológicas de Torres Vedras (1987): 55-60. Lisboa: IPPAR (Trabalhos de Arqueologia 7).
- Clayre, B. et al. 2013. Kamus Sa’ban Si’ Latoon. Persatuan Masyarakat Saban Miri. Sarawak. Malaysia.
- Clayre, B. et al. 2014. Kamus Sa’ban Hmeu Sa’ban. Persatuan Masyarakat Saban Miri. Sarawak. Malaysia.
