= Arthur S. Abramson =

American linguist

- Born: January 26, 1925; Jersey City, New Jersey, U.S.
- Died: December 15, 2017 (aged 92)

Academic background
- Education: Yeshiva University (B.A.); Columbia University (M.A., Ph.D.)

Academic work
- Discipline: Linguist
- Institutions: University of Connecticut

Arthur Seymour Abramson (January 26, 1925 – December 15, 2017) was an American linguist, phonetician, and speech scientist. Abramson was born in Jersey City, New Jersey. He founded the Department of Linguistics at the University of Connecticut and served as head of the department from 1967 to 1974. Abramson was a Senior Scientist at Haskins Laboratories in New Haven, Connecticut, and he was also a member of Haskins's Board of Directors and the secretary of the corporation. He served as president of the Linguistic Society of America in 1983.

Abramson was best known for his work with colleague Leigh Lisker on voice onset timing. He was also an expert on Southeast Asian languages and spent much time working with colleagues in Thailand. His other research interests included experimental phonetics, the production and perception of speech, laryngeal control in consonants, and distinctive tone, particularly in the Thai language. He died on December 15, 2017.

== Education ==
Arthur Abramson received his B.A. in 1949 from Yeshiva University. He received his M.A. in 1950 and Ph.D. in 1960 from Columbia University.

== Selected publications ==
- Abramson, A.S. (1962) The Vowels and Tones of Standard Thai: Acoustical Measurements and Experiments. Bloomington: Indiana U. Res. Center in Anthropology, Folklore, and Linguistics, Pub. 20.
- Lisker, L.; Abramson, A.S. (1964). "A cross-language study of voicing in initial stops: Acoustical measurements". Word. 20 (3): 384–422. doi:10.1080/00437956.1964.11659830.
- Abramson, A.S. (1977). "Laryngeal timing in consonant distinctions". Phonetica. 37 (4): 295–303. doi:10.1159/000259888. PMID 594164. S2CID 46853333.
- Abramson, A.S. (1986). "The perception of word-initial consonant length: Pattani Malay". Journal of the International Phonetic Association. 16: 8–16. doi:10.1017/S0025100300003054. S2CID 145679278.
- Abramson, A.S. and D.M. Erickson. (1992) Tone splits and voicing shifts in Thai: Phonetic plausibility. In Pan Asiatic Linguistics: Proceedings of the Third International Symposium on Language and Linguistics, Vol. I (pp. 1–16). Bangkok: Chulalongkorn University.
