= Prasanna Vadanam =

2024 Indian Telugu film

- Theatrical release poster
- Directed by: Arjun Y. K.
- Written by: Arjun Y. K.
- Produced by: Manikanta J. S.; Prasad Reddy T. R.
- Starring: Suhas; Payal Radhakrishna; Rashi Singh; Nandu; Harsha Chemudu; Nithin Prasanna
- Cinematography: S. Chandrasekaran
- Edited by: Karthika Srinivas
- Music by: Vijai Bulganin
- Production company: Little Thoughts Cinemas
- Distributed by: Hombale Films
- Release date: 3 May 2024
- Running time: 146 minutes
- Country: India
- Language: Telugu

Prasanna Vadanam, alternatively spelled as Prasannavadhanam, is a 2024 Indian Telugu-language crime thriller film written and directed by Arjun Y. K., produced Little Thoughts Cinemas. The film features Suhas, Payal Radhakrishna and Rashi Singh in primary roles along with Nandu, Harsha Chemudu, Nithin Prasanna among others.

The music was composed by Vijai Bulganin, cinematography done by S. Chandrasekaran, along with editing by Karthika Srinivas. The film was theatrically released on 3 May 2024.

== Plot ==
Surya meets with an accident from which he develops incurable complications—phonagnosia and prosopagnosia—making him unable to recognise people by their voices or faces. After recovery, Surya gradually adapts to his condition by learning to identify people through non-facial cues such as name tags, clothing, posture, and hairstyle. A few years later, Surya is in a relationship with Aadhya. One night, he witnesses a murder: a man pushes a young woman under a moving truck. Surya informs his friend Vignesh, who advises him not to report the incident to the police, warning that revealing his condition could expose him to discrimination.

However, Surya makes an anonymous phone call to the police and reports what he witnessed. The information reaches Sub-Inspector Ramachandra—who is, in fact, the very murderer Surya saw. Panicked, Ramachandra tries to identify who made the call. Ramachandra retrieves CCTV footage from near the phone booth used to make the call. Although Surya's face is not visible, his car's license plate is captured, which Ramachandra uses to locate him. Sometime later, Ramachandra spots Surya's car being driven by Aadhya. He follows her, locates Surya, and assaults him as a warning to stop cooperating with the police.

Rather than being intimidated, Surya becomes more determined to seek justice for the victim. The following day, he visits the police station to formally lodge a complaint about the assault and also reports the murder he witnessed. Although he cannot recognise faces, Surya mentions a distinctive tattoo he noticed on the attacker. ACP Vaidehi records his statement and assures him that action will be taken. After Surya leaves, Vaidehi scolds Ramachandra for his recklessness—revealing that she herself was involved in the murder. They then decide to frame Surya and eliminate him.

A few days later, Surya is arrested for the same murder he witnessed, based on fabricated witness testimony and doctored CCTV footage. Surya maintains his innocence, but the police refuse to believe him. As part of judicial procedure, Surya is taken to a clinic for a medical examination. Vaidehi and Ramachandra have already arranged for two hired goons to kill him there. While Surya is in the washroom depositing a urine sample, the goons attack him. A police officer attempts to intervene but is killed. Despite being injured, Surya manages to escape.

Surya reunites with Vignesh and Aadhya to plan his next move. He tracks down Vinod, the fake witness who testified against him. Vinod tries to flee but is struck by a truck during the chase and dies. Surya and Vignesh then investigate the location from where the forged CCTV footage originated and discover Ramachandra's involvement in fabricating the evidence. Surya sneaks into Ramachandra's house and finds proof linking him to the murder. When Ramachandra and his wife return home, Surya takes their toddler hostage and forces Ramachandra to confess:

ACP Vaidehi is deeply insecure about her marriage to her husband Varun. She routinely abuses her police authority to intimidate or eliminate anyone she perceives as a threat to her marriage. After marriage, Vaidehi is diagnosed as infertile, which devastates Varun. They later agree to pursue surrogacy and select a young, healthy woman named Amrutha, who moves into their house during the pregnancy. Varun grows increasingly caring toward Amrutha, triggering Vaidehi’s jealousy. Vaidehi later discovers that the baby Amrutha is carrying is not conceived from her own egg but from Amrutha’s, as Vaidehi’s eggs were deemed unviable—a fact Varun deliberately concealed from her. Consumed by rage and jealousy, Vaidehi conspires with Ramachandra to murder Amrutha.

Under pressure from Surya and his wife, Ramachandra agrees to help clear Surya's name. He goes to Vaidehi's house and pleads for Surya's life, but Vaidehi brutally murders him. Surya secretly records the killing and escapes.

Surya and Vignesh plan to submit the video evidence to a magistrate to bring Vaidehi to justice. However, Vaidehi disguises herself as Aadhya by dyeing her hair in the same style, knowing Surya identifies people by hairstyle. She lures Surya away to a remote location and attacks him. The real Aadhya arrives at the scene, but Surya mistakes her for the impostor and accidentally assaults her.

In the climax, Surya is faced with two identical-looking Aadhyas, both claiming to be the real one. Unable to distinguish between them, Surya shoots himself in the shoulder. The real Aadhya instinctively rushes to help him, while Vaidehi attempts to seize a metal rod to kill them both. Seizing the moment, Surya shoots Vaidehi dead.

== Cast ==
- Suhas as Surya
- Payal Radhakrishna as Aadhya
- Rashi Singh as ACP Vaidehi
- Nandu as Varun
- Harsha Chemudu as Vignesh
- Ananth as House Owner
- Nithin Prasanna as SI Ramachandra
- Sai Swetha as Amrutha
- Kushalini Pulapa as Aadhya's friend
- Surabhi Prabhavathi as Amrutha's Mother
- Naveena Reddy as Ramachandra's wife
- Madhumani Naidu as Aadhya's Mother

== Release ==
Prasanna Vadanam was theatrically released on 3 May 2024. Post-theatrical digital streaming rights were acquired by Aha and was premiered on 24 May 2024.

== Reception ==
BH Harsh of The New Indian Express rated this film 3.5 stars out of 5 stars and stated that "Despite an occasional hiccup and a few logical loopholes, the narrative manages to keep us engaged due to this compelling cat-and-mouse dynamic between the good and the evil." The Times of India also gave the same rating and stated: "The film's unique plot is its strength, although it could have benefited from a tighter edit to enhance its pace, particularly in the early sections of the second half."

Nelki Naresh Kumar of Hindustan Times gave a rating of 3 and noted "Prasanna Vadanam is a crime thriller movie that covers the new Experience." Anna Yashwanth of Deccan Chronicle rated this film 2.75 stars out of 5 stars and noted "For those who enjoy psychological depth and thrilling stories, Prasanna Vadanam is a movie worth watching."
