= Pengiran Bala =

Malaysian footballer

Pengiran Bala (born 1963 in Sarawak) is a former Sarawak FA player and coach.

He scored the fastest goal in the Malaysia Cup when he scored a goal just 8 seconds after the opening whistle against Pahang FA in 1989.

Pengiran Bala is a Malaysian people of Kelabit Descent
