= Lengilu language =

Nearly extinct language

Lengilu
- Native to: Indonesia
- Region: Borneo
- Native speakers: (3 cited 2000)
- Language family: Austronesian: Malayo-Polynesian; North Bornean; North Sarawakan; Apo Duat; Lengilu

Language codes
- ISO 639-3: lgi
- Glottolog: leng1260
- ELP: Lengilu

Lengilu is a nearly extinct language of Indonesian Borneo. At present, there are only four native speakers of Lengilu.
