= Leigh Lisker =

American linguist

Leigh Lisker (December 7, 1918 – March 24, 2006) was an eminent American linguist and phonetician. Most of his career was spent at the University of Pennsylvania, where he was a professor and then emeritus professor of linguistics. Dr. Lisker received his A.B. in 1941, with a major in German, his M.A. in 1946, and a Ph.D. in 1949 in linguistics. He was a major figure in phonetics, working both at the University of Pennsylvania and at Haskins Laboratories in New Haven, CT, where he was a senior scientist from 1951 until the end of his life. He collaborated with several phoneticians, principally Arthur S. Abramson. He is best known for his work, done mostly in conjunction with Abramson, on voice onset time. Dr. Lisker also made important contributions to Dravidian linguistics, including the book Introduction to Spoken Telugu (Telugu), and did research comparing phonetic and phonological perceptions on the part of linguistically naive and linguistically sophisticated speakers of different native language backgrounds. He conducted such studies in collaboration with Dr. Abramson of the University of Connecticut, Bh. Krishnamurti of University of Hyderabad, India, Adrian Fourcin of University College London, and Mario Rossi of the Institut de Phonétique at the Université de Provence, Aix-en-Provence.

== Selected publications ==
- Lisker, L. Minimal cues for separating /w,r,l,y/ in intervocalic position. Word, 1957, 13, 257-267.
- Lisker, L. Linguistic segments, acoustic segments and synthetic speech. Language, 1957, 33, 370-374.
- Lisker, L., Cooper, F.S., & Liberman, A.M. The uses of experiment in language description. Word, 1962, 18, 82-106.
- Lisker, L. & Abramson, A.S. A cross-language study of voicing in initial stops: acoustical measurements. Word, 1964, 20, 384-422.
- Lisker, L. & Abramson, A.S. Distinctive features and laryngeal control. Language, 1971, 47, 767-785.
- Lisker, L. On time and timing in speech. In T.A. Sebeok (Ed.), Current Trends in Linguistics, Vol. 12, The Hague: Mouton, 1974, 2387-2418.
- Lisker, L. The pursuit of invariance in speech signals. JASA, 1985, 77, 1199-1202.
- Lisker, L. "Voicing" in English: A catalogue of acoustic features signaling /b/ versus /p/ in trochees. Language and Speech, 1986, 29, 3-11.
