= Apo Duat languages =

Apo Duat
- Dayic
- Geographic distribution: Sarawak and North Kalimantan, Borneo
- Linguistic classification: Austronesian: Malayo-Polynesian; North Bornean; North Sarawakan; Apo Duat

Language codes
- Glottolog: kela1257

The Apo Duat or Dayic languages are a group of closely related languages spoken by the Kelabit, Lun Bawang, and related peoples. They are:

- Kelabitic: Kelabit, Lengilu, Sa'ban, Tring
- Lundayeh: Lun Bawang, Adang, Balait, Kolur, Lepu Potng, Lun Dayah, Lun Daye, Padas, Trusan, Mengalong.

There are also some areal features in common with surrounding languages.

The people who speak these languages have a mythology that they were survivors of a great flood thousands of years ago, and are indigenous to the mountains of Indonesia, as Apo Uat translates as "root range"; however, based upon linguistic evidence and other facts, it is more likely that they settled those Borneo highlands in the 17th to 19th centuries, which is the time scale origin of this language family.

Putoh may be an additional language, or it may be a dialect of Lundayeh.
