= Casey O'Callaghan =

American philosopher

- Awards: NEH, 2017–18

Education
- Education: Princeton University (PhD), Rutgers University (BA)

Philosophical work
- Era: 21st-century philosophy
- Region: Western philosophy
- Institutions: Washington University in St. Louis
- Main interests: philosophy of mind and perception, metaphysics
- Website: caseyocallaghan.com

Casey O'Callaghan is an American philosopher and Professor of Philosophy and Philosophy-Neuroscience-Psychology at Washington University in St. Louis. He is known for his works on philosophy of perception.

== Books ==
- Sounds: A Philosophical Theory, Oxford University Press, 2007; paperback, 2010
- Sounds and Perception: New Philosophical Essays, Oxford University Press, 2009; paperback, 2013
- Beyond Vision: Philosophical Essays, Oxford University Press, 2017
- A Multisensory Philosophy of Perception, Oxford University Press, 2019; paperback 2021
