= Kelabit people =

Ethnic group of Borneo

Kelabit people Orang Kelabit / Kalabit
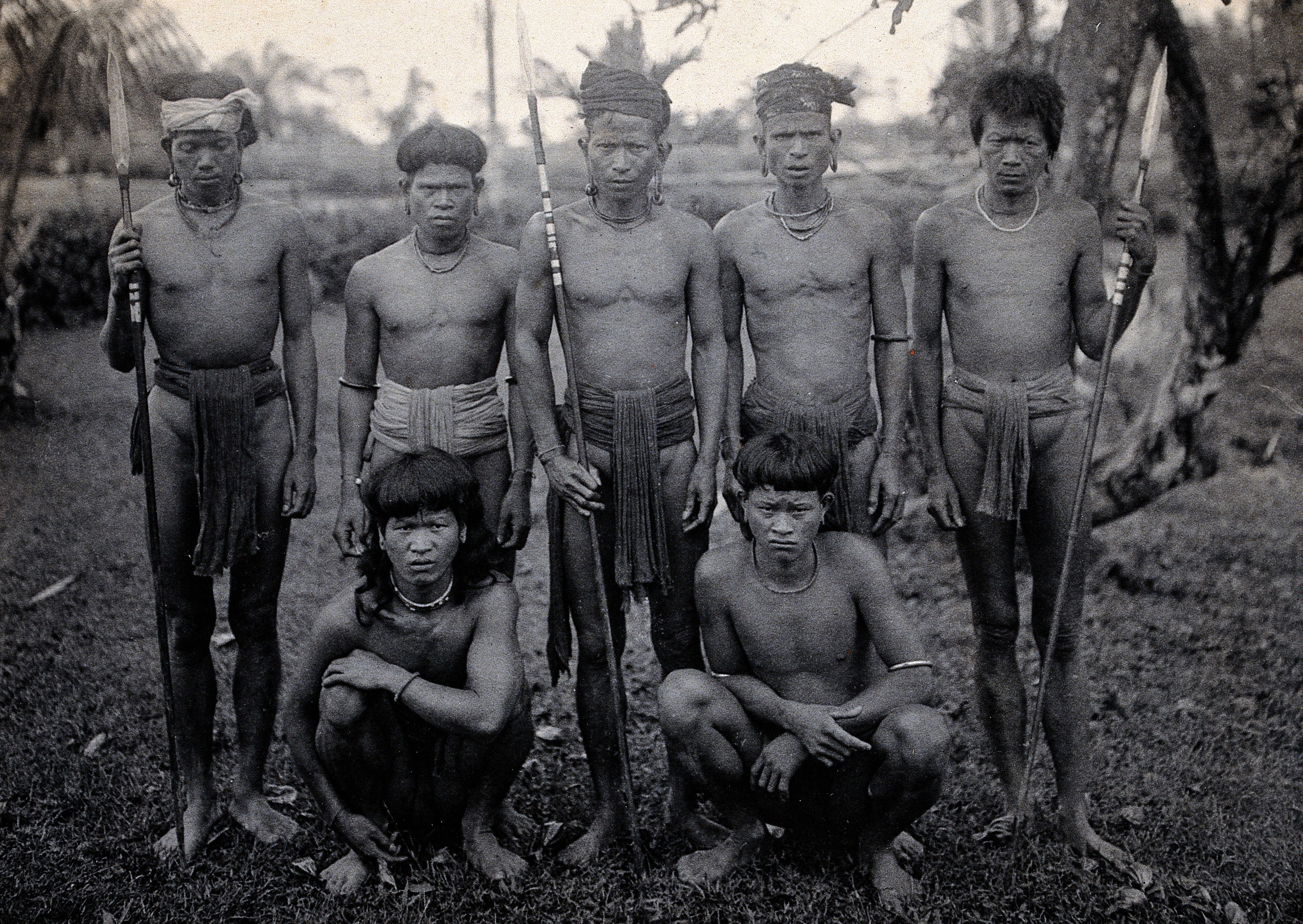
- A group of native Kelabit men, 1912.

Total population
- approximately 6,000 (2013)

Regions with significant populations
- Borneo
- Malaysia (Sarawak): 6,600
- Indonesia (North Kalimantan): 790
- Brunei: no census

Languages
- Kelabit, Malay (Sarawakian Malay), English, Indonesian

Religion
- Christianity (predominantly), Animism

Related ethnic groups
- Other Apo Duat peoples (Kiput, Berawan, Lun Bawang, Sa'ban), Other Orang Ulu peoples

The Kelabit are an indigenous Dayak people of the Sarawak/North Kalimantan highlands of Borneo with a minority in the neighbouring state of Brunei. They have close ties to the Lun Bawang. The elevation there is slightly over 1,200 meters. In the past, because there were few roads (only poorly maintained logging roads, which tended not to be too close to the Bario Highlands) and because the area was largely inaccessible by river because of rapids, the highlands and the Kelabit were relatively untouched by modern western influences. Now, however, there is a relatively permanent road route on which it is possible to reach Bario by car from Miri. The road is marked but driving without a local guide is not advisable, as it takes over 11 hours of driving to reach Bario from Miri through many logging trail junctions and river crossings.

With a population of approximately 6,600 people (2013), the Kelabit comprise one of the smallest ethnic groups in Sarawak. Many have migrated to urban areas over the last 20 years and it is estimated that only 1,200 still live in their remote homeland. There, tightly knit communities live in inherited longhouses and practice a generations-old form of agriculture. Hunting and fishing are also practised. Domesticated buffalo are valued highly, seven of which are traditionally required for the dowry for an upper-class bride.

== Etymology ==
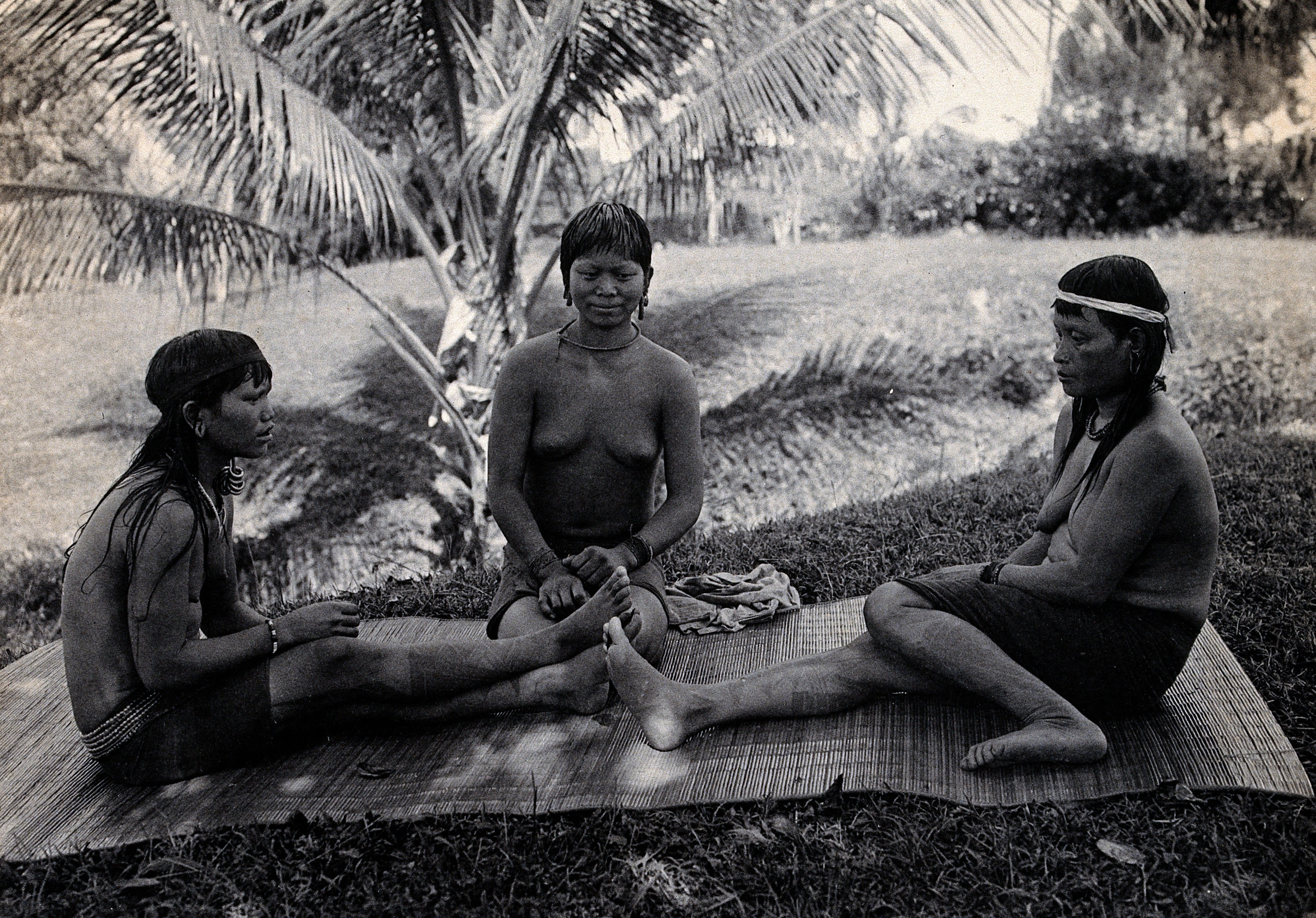
Three native Kelabit women, 1922.

Kelabit is the misnomer of pa Labid, whereby pa is the Kelabit word for 'river' and Labid is the name of the river where the Kelabit people traditionally settle along. Hence, pa Labid is meant to be "the people of the Labid river". Also, other group names such as Lun Bawang, Lun Dayeh, or Southern Muruts are often associated with the Kelabit people. The Kelabit people belong to the Dayak people (it is a large ethnic group of closely related people groups that includes about 200 tribes). With a population of approximately 6,600, the Kelabit people are the smallest people group in the state of Sarawak.

== History ==
During the Second World War, the Kelabit, like other natives of Borneo, was co-opted by the Allies into fighting the Japanese. The English academic Tom Harrisson led the Semut I operations (one of four Semut operations in the area), which parachuted into their midst in 1945 to make contact; they were supplied with weapons by the Australian military and played an essential role in the liberation of Borneo.

== Religion ==
After the Second World War, the Kelabit people received visits from Christian missionaries of the Borneo Evangelical Mission. The Kelabit are now predominantly Christian. Prior to conversion, they had a custom of erecting megaliths and digging ditches in honour of notable individuals. As the Kelabit people began to Christianize in the early 20th century, so did the process of ethnic consolidation were also intensified.

== Language ==
The Kelabit people uses Latin script that was introduced to the island by the colonialist from Europe. The Kelabit language belongs to the North Bornean branch of the Western Malayo-Polynesian languages. The Kelabit language is used in one of the most remote areas of the Borneo island in the Bario highlands of Kalimantan and northern Sarawak. There are several dialects in the Kelabitic languages such as Lepu Potng, Padas, Trusan, and so on.

== Culture ==
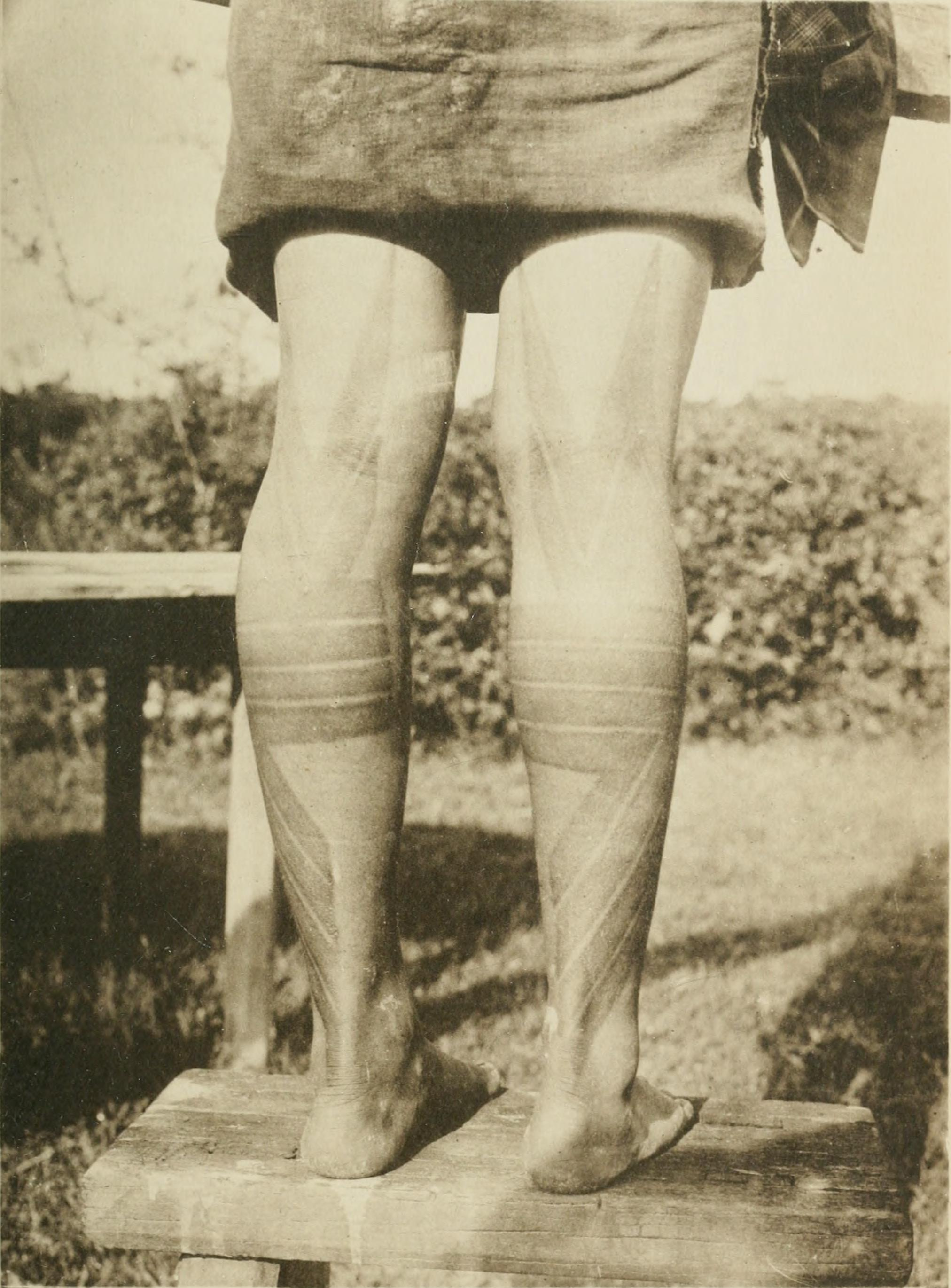
Kelabit woman's tattoo, 1912.

=== Family ===
There is a strict order (rule) of inheritance, which includes the need for one person to organize expensive commemorative celebrations (perhaps, a wake) for people who inherit from them. The conflict between older brothers and sisters can be particularly noticeable in connection with these circumstances. In any case, the Kelabit family is a cooperating unit.

Adults are called lun merar, which literally means "big people". In order to attain adulthood, one must have three things:-

1. A spouse, with whom one would grow rice together
2. Children
3. Rice, with which one would be able to feed their children and grandchildren

In rural communities, there is a division of castes namely, the nobility, the ordinary community members, and the descendants of those who were in slavery. The leader always comes from the nobility. He must have things that are regarded as special prestige among the Kelabit people. These are ancient items of Chinese origin such as, porcelain vases, beads, or gongs, as well as items that are made from pearls.

=== Settlements ===
Kelabit villages usually include only one longhouse, in which all the inhabitants of the community would live in. A longhouse can stretch as long as 75 meters in length. Such house does not have partitions that divide into rooms.

=== Clothing ===
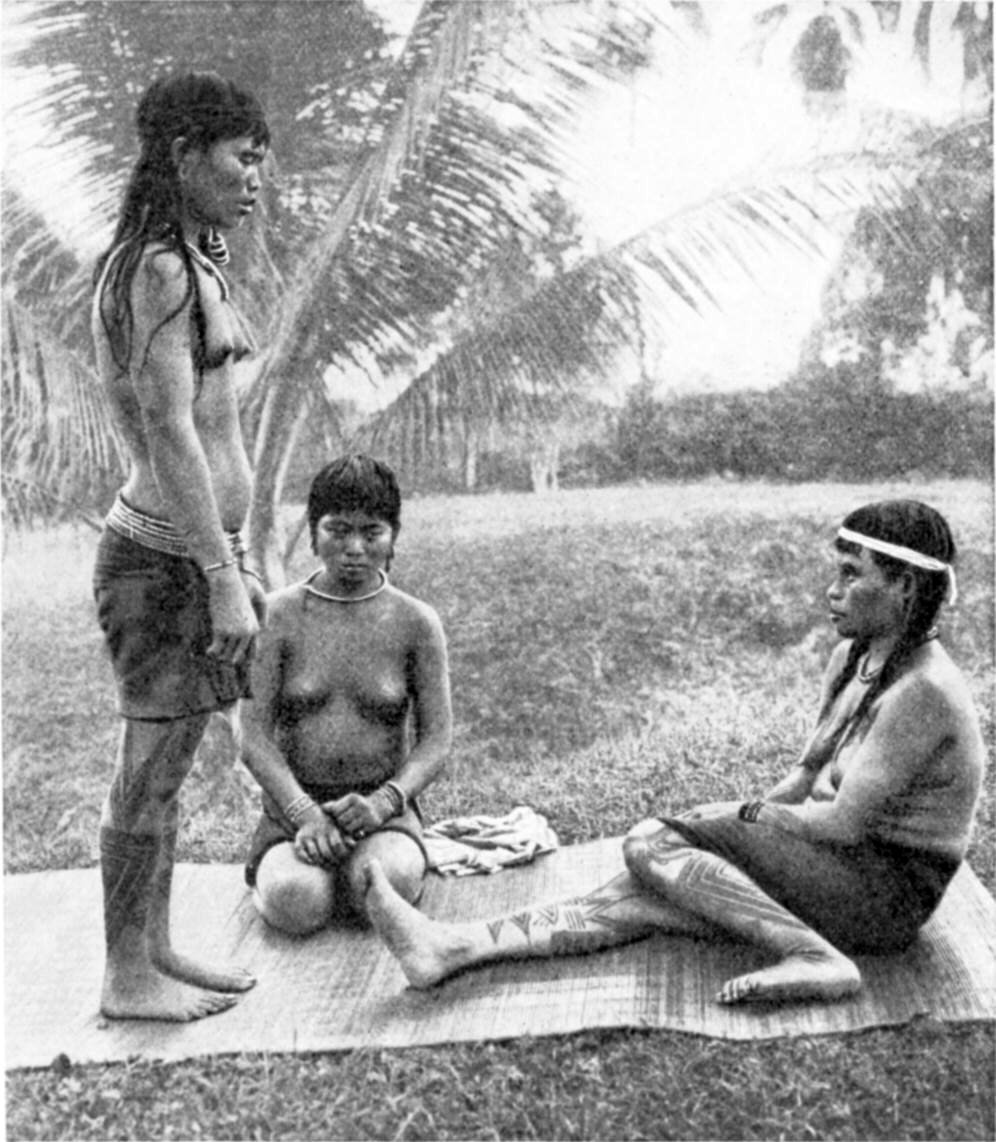
All Kelabit women are tattooed when they reach the age of 16. Bold zigzag bands are traced on the forearm, not completely encircling the limb, and strikingly decorative geometrical designs are tattooed on the thigh, the shin, and sometimes, on the knee-cap. They wear strings of large blue beads around the waist and wrist, and necklaces of smaller beads. 1922.

In traditional society, men wear traditional loincloths, and women would wear a skirt made of Tapa cloth (material from the inside of the tree bark). Some would prefer Westernized clothing. The custom of tattooing and dulling of teeth have also become less prevalent.

=== Cuisine ===
Rice, for the Kelabit people, symbolizes the true human food. Kelabit people mainly eat rice, as well as meat, fruits, vegetables, corn, and sugar cane. Some of the traditional Kelabit cuisines are the following:-

- Nubak Layak, mashed rice wrapped in Isip leaf.
- Manuk Pansuh / Pansoh, seasoned chicken cooked in bamboo.
- Udung Ubih, tapioca leaves stir-fried with lemongrass.
- A'beng, de-boned fish.
- Pa’uh Ab’pa, fish cooked in brinjal, cucumber, and black fungus soup.
- Labo Senutuq, shredded beef stir-fried with bamboo shoots and Kantan flower salad.

=== Festivals ===
- Bario Food and Culture Festival (Irau Nukenen Bario)

2019 dates are 25th, 26th, 27 July

=== Traditional activities ===
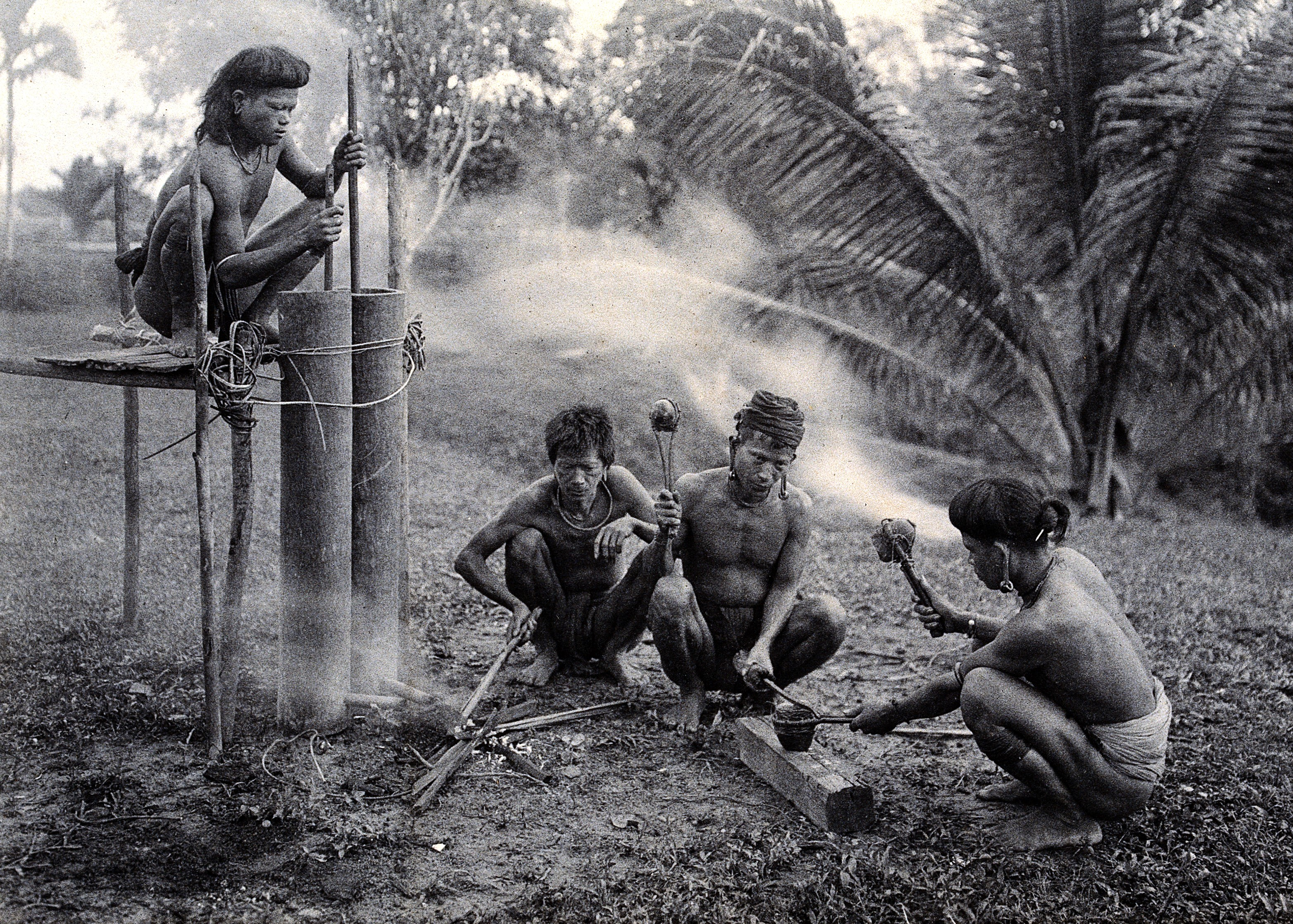
Kelabit blacksmith in Sarawak, Malaysia, circa 1896.

Pottery, blacksmithing, and wood carving are all traditional crafts of Kelabit people. The form of the stone adze (chopping tools) of the Kelabit differs noticeably from the types previously recorded in Southeast Asia; where its 'quadrangular' is from Malaysia, and there is no 'round ax'. Agriculture is a traditional occupation of the Kelabit people. Other traditional occupation includes needle-working. There are 69 items with pearls (necklaces, hats, and belts) decorations. Pearl jewelry is a sign of prestige, just like Chinese porcelain vases. Necklaces are worn by both men and women, while headdresses are exclusively for women. Kelabit people are interested in precious stones. Earlier before they became Christians, the Kelabit people had stone amulets.

== Livelihood and economy ==
The traditional occupation of Kelabit people is agriculture. The main cultivar is rice. They distinguish between wet paddy field and dried paddy field. In the north of the Bario Highlands, there are only wet paddy field areas. In other parts of the Highlands, dried paddy field areas have also been made, as well as other crops that have also been planted in these paddy field areas. The Kelabit people are also cultivators of maize, tapioca, pineapple, pumpkin, cucumber, beans, coffee, lemongrass, taro, and various fruits like passion fruit and strawberry. Livestock development is limited. Meat is a special problem, as traditionally the Kelabit people used it only for sacrifices, and even today almost no animals are slaughtered for daily consumption (since, at present, there are still many Kelabit people who are adherents of traditional beliefs). Subsequently, they began to raise animals for dairy products and meat. The forest is the main source of wild fruits and vegetables. Forest gathering, hunting, and fishing are common. Kelabit people engage in salt extraction; which plays a significant role in their economy. With salt, they would exchange from other people for their own necessities.

== Notable people ==
- Pengiran Bala - former football player for Malaysia Team and Sarawak FA. Currently coach for Sarawak United FC
- Kuda Ditta (1937–2003) - first Sarawak Olympian and policeman.
- Idris Jala - former Malaysian minister.
- Alena Murang - Kuching-born artist, dancer, musician, teacher, activist, social entrepreneur and cultural ambassador. She is of Kelabit-English-Italian descent.
- Hannah Tan - Penang-born singer-songwriter, model and actress. She is of Chinese-Kelabit descent.
