= Phonagnosia =

Type of auditory agnosia

Phonagnosia (from Ancient Greek φωνή phone, "voice" and γνῶσις gnosis, "knowledge") or voice blindness is a type of agnosia, or loss of knowledge, that involves a disturbance in the recognition of familiar voices and the impairment of voice discrimination abilities in which the affected individual does not suffer from comprehension deficits. Phonagnosia is an auditory agnosia, an acquired auditory processing disorder resulting from brain damage. Other auditory agnosias include cortical deafness and auditory verbal agnosia also known as pure word deafness.

Since people suffering from phonagnosia do not suffer from aphasia, it is suggested that the structures of linguistic comprehension are functionally separate from those of the perception of the identity of the speaker who produced it.

== History ==
Phonagnosia is the auditory equivalent of prosopagnosia. Unlike prosopagnosia, investigations of phonagnosia have not been extensively pursued. Phonagnosia was first described by a study by Van Lancker and Cantor in 1982. The subjects in this study were asked to identify which of four names or faces matched a specific famous voice. The subjects could not complete the task. Since then, there have been a couple studies done on patients with phonagnosia. The clinical and radiologic findings with computerized tomographic scans (CAT scans) in these cases suggest that recognition of familiar voices is impaired by damage to the inferior and parietal regions of the right hemisphere while voice discrimination is impaired by temporal lobe damage of either hemisphere. These studies have also shown evidence for a double dissociation between voice recognition and voice discrimination. Some patients will perform normally on the discrimination tasks but poorly on the recognition tasks; whereas the other patients will perform normally on the recognition tasks but poorly on the discrimination tasks. Patients did not perform poorly on both tasks.

Associative phonagnosia is a form of phonagnosia that develops with dementia or other focal neurodegenerative disorders. Some research has led to questions of other impairments in phonagnosics. Recently, studies have shown that phonagnosics also have trouble in recognizing the sounds of familiar instruments. As it is with voices, they also show deficiency in distinguishing between sounds from different instruments. Although the disability is shown, phonagnosics are much less affected in this area of sound discrimination. In distinguishing voices, it is a complete agnosia, but this is not the case for musical instrument sounds, as they can correctly identify some of them. Controversy arises in that not all phonagnosics exhibit these symptoms, and so not all researchers agree that it should be attributed to the damage suffered that causes phonagnosia. Much debate has arisen over the fact that it seems that separate areas of the brain are utilized to handle information from language and music. This has led some researchers to skeptically consider this impairment as a clear symptom of the disorder. Again, more research is needed to create a clearer conclusion.

An interesting attribute that phonagnosics possess is that they can correctly detect emotions in voices when someone talks to them. They can also correctly match an emotion with a facial expression. Although surprising, this finding is sensible because it is known and well agreed upon that the limbic system, involved in expressing emotions and detecting emotions of others, is a separate system within the brain. The limbic system is made up of several brain structures including the hippocampus, amygdala, anterior thalamic nuclei, septum, limbic cortex and fornix.

Presently, there is no therapy or treatment for phonagnosia. Clearly, more research is needed to accomplish the feat of developing treatment for the disorder. The lack of treatment stems from the lack of knowledge about the disorder. Increased research will reveal vital information needed to formulate effective treatments and therapies.

== Case studies ==
It is progressive and gets worse as the disorder worsens. QR and KL participated in a study done of auditory and visual tasks accompanied by a brain MRI. QR suffered a deficit in voice recognition only, while KL had an associative form of prosoagnosia. The auditory and visual deficits could then be compared with an MRI of each patient's brain. The MRI of QR, a patient with a behavioural variant frontotemporal dementia, shows bilateral fronto-temporal atrophy mostly in the right anterior temporal lobe but extending back within the temporal lobe and including the superior temporal sulcus. The MRI of KL showed bilateral anterior temporal lobe atrophy, with more damage on the right side and in the inferior temporal cortices. The clinical diagnosis of KL was temporal variant frontotemporal lobar degeneration with progressive right temporal lobe atrophy.

More recently, there has been a study of developmental phonagnosia. KH, a 60-year-old woman who exhibits all the symptoms of impairments in vocal recognition, but does not have any of the brain damage associated with such impairment. Additionally, KH has suffered from this inability to recognize voices for her whole life, making her the first known case of developmental phonagnosia. The study of KH has turned the research world of phonagnosia on its head because it was thought that phonagnosia resulted only after damage to the parietal and temporal lobes had been sustained. The discovery that phonagnosia can exist without structural damage shows that the disorder can be the result of cognitive abnormalities. Given the recency of this study, little research has been conducted on the cognitive based theories. Areas of interest lie in the neural connections between the various areas in the parietal lobe, as well as those within the temporal lobe. Developmental phonagnosia suggests in the name itself that the disorder develops when the brain is developing in the womb and throughout childhood. Researchers have suggested that neurons are not making the connections needed for the correct identification of voices, familiar or unfamiliar. Still, no solid theories have been formed and research studies to test these individuals in its developmental stage.

== Pop Culture ==
The protagonist in the Tollywood film Prasanna Vadanam is afflicted with this disorder due to brain injury.

== See also ==
- Auditory processing disorder
