= Tring language =

Austronesian language spoken in Sarawak, Malaysia

Tring
- Native to: Malaysia
- Region: Borneo
- Native speakers: (550 cited 2000)
- Language family: Austronesian: Malayo-Polynesian; North Bornean; North Sarawakan; Apo Duat; Tring

Language codes
- ISO 639-3: tgq
- Glottolog: trin1273

Tring is one of the languages of Borneo, in Sarawak, Malaysia. Ethnologue classifies the language as threatened.
