= Kelabit language =

Austronesian language spoken on Borneo

Kelabit
- Region: Borneo
- Native speakers: (5,000 cited 2000–2011)
- Language family: Austronesian: Malayo-Polynesian; North Bornean; North Sarawakan; Apo Duat; Kelabit

Language codes
- ISO 639-3: kzi
- Glottolog: kela1258

Kelabit among the languages of Kalimantan (orange #27, top)

Kelabit is one of the most remote languages of Borneo, on the Sarawak–North Kalimantan border. It is spoken by one of the smallest ethnicities in Borneo, the Kelabit people.

== Phonology ==
Kelabit vowels are /ə, a, e, i, o, u/. All consonants but the aspirated voiced stops are lengthened after stressed /ə/. Stress generally occurs on the penultimate syllable.

Kelabit is notable for having "a typologically rare series of true voiced aspirates" (that is, not breathy voice/murmured consonants; for some speakers they are prevoiced) along with modally voiced and tenuis consonants but without an accompanying series of voiceless aspirates. It is the only language known to have voiced aspirates or murmured consonants without also having voiceless aspirated consonants, a situation that has been reconstructed for Proto-Indo-European.

Kelabit consonants
		Bilabial	Dental/ Alveolar	Palatal (-alveolar)	Velar	Glottal
Nasal		m	n		ŋ	
Stop	tenuis	p	t̪		k	ʔ
Stop	modally voiced	b	d͇	(dʒ)	ɡ	
Stop	aspirated voiced /prevoiced	b͡pʰ ~ b͡p	d͇͡t͇ʃʰ ~ d͇͡t͇		ɡ͡kʰ ~ ɡ͡k	
Fricative			s			h
Sonorant			l, ɾ͇	j	w	

At the end of a word, /t/ is pronounced [θ]. For some speakers, /d͇͡t͇ʰ/ is affricated; in neighboring Lun Dayeh, the reflex of this consonant is an unaspirated affricate [d͡tʃ]. /dʒ/ is rare, and is not attested from all dialects.

The flap is alveolar. It's not clear if /n/ and the other coronal sonorants are alveolar like /d/ or dental like /t/.

The aspirated voiced series only occurs intervocalically, and may have arisen from geminate consonants. They are at least impressionistically twice as long as other stops. They vary with /b d͇ ɡ/ under suffixation, with /b͡pʰ d͇͡t͇ʰ ɡ͡kʰ/ occurring where other consonants would be allophonically geminated:

- /təb͡pʰəŋ/ [ˈtəb͡pʰəŋ] 'to fell' > /təbəŋ-ən/ [təˈbəŋːən] 'fell it!'
- /kətəd/ [ˈkətːəd] 'back (n)' > /kətəd͇͡t͇ʰ-ən/ [kəˈtəd͇͡t͇ʰən] 'to be left behind'

There are several arguments for analyzing the aspirated voiced consonants as segments rather than as consonant clusters:

- There are no (other) clusters allowed in the language. Some languages allow only geminate consonants as clusters, but there are no (other) phonemic geminates in Kelabit. In some related languages, such as Ida'an, the reflexes of these sounds clearly do behave as clusters.
- The syllable break occurs before the consonants (that is, [a.bpa], and not in the middle ([ab.pa]), which is the behaviour of consonant clusters (including geminates) in related languages that allow them. /i, u/ lower to [ɪ, ʊ] before any non-glottal coda consonant. They do not lower before the aspirated voiced consonants, again suggesting they are not consonant clusters.

The aspirated voiced series does not appear in all dialects of Kelabit or Lun Dayeh:

Reflexes in Kelabit and Lun Dayeh dialects
b͡p⁽ʰ⁾	d͡t⁽ʰ⁾	ɡ͡k⁽ʰ⁾	Bario, Pa' Omor, Long Lellang, Lun Dayeh: Long Semado
p	t	k	Pa' Mada
p	tʃ	k	Long Terawan Tring
p	s	k	Batu Patung, Pa' Dalih, Sa'ban
f	tʃ	k	Lun Dayeh: Long Pala
f	s	k	Long Napir, Long Seridan

== Bibliography ==
- Asmah Haji Omar (1983). The Malay Peoples of Malaysia and Their Languages. Kuala Lumpur: Art Printing Works.
- Blust, Robert (1974). The Proto-North Sarawak vowel deletion hypothesis. PhD Dissertation, University of Hawai‘i at Manoa.
- Blust, Robert (1993). ‘Kelabit-English vocabulary’. Sarawak Museum Journal 44 (65): 141‑226.
- Blust, Robert (2006). ‘The Origin of the Kelabit Voiced Aspirates: A Historical Hypothesis Revisited’. Oceanic Linguistics 45 (2): 311-338.
- Blust, Robert (2016). Kelabit-Lun Dayeh Phonology, with Special Reference to the Voiced Aspirates. Oceanic Linguistics 55 (1): 246-277.
- Bolang, Alexander & Tom Harrisson (1949). ‘Murut and related vocabularies with special reference to North Borneo terminology’. Sarawak Museum Journal 5: 116-124
- Douglas, R. S. (1911). ‘A comparative vocabulary of the Kayan, Kenyan and Kelabit dialects’. Sarawak Museum Journal 1 (1): 75-119.
- Galih, Balang (1965). Kapah Ayo’ Tana’ Inih Pangah Penudut Guma Nepeled. How the World was Made by Guma Nepeled: A Kelabit-Murut Story. The Sarawak Gazette, May 31, 152.
- Hemmings, Charlotte (2015). Kelabit Voice: Philippine-Type, Indonesian-Type or Something a Bit Different? Transactions of the Philological Society 113(3): 383-405.
- Hemmings, Charlotte (2016). The Kelabit Language, Austronesian Voice and Syntactic Typology. PhD Dissertation, Department of Linguistics, SOAS, University of London.
- Martin, Peter W (1996). A Comparative Ethnolinguistic Survey of the Murut (Lun Bawang) with Special Reference to Brunei. In Peter W. Martin, Conrad Oz̊óg & Gloria Poedjosoedarmo (eds.), Language Use and Language Change in Brunei Darussalam, 268-279. Athens, OH: Ohio University Press.
- Martin, Peter W. & Eileen Yen (1994). Language use among the Kelabit living in urban centres. In Peter W. Martin (ed.), Shifting Patterns of Language Use in Borneo, 147 163. Williamsburg VA: Borneo Research Council.
