= Pre-voicing =

Prevoicing, in phonetics, is voicing before the onset of a consonant or beginning with the onset of the consonant but ending before its release. In the extensions to the International Phonetic Alphabet for speech pathology, prevoicing is transcribed with a voicing diacritic (U+02EC ˬ MODIFIER LETTER VOICING) placed in front of the consonant, as in [ˬd].

In several Khoisan languages of Southern Africa, such as Taa and !Kung, stops such as /dzʰ/ ([dsʰ] or [dtsʰ]) and /dzʼ/ ([dsʼ] or [dtsʼ]) are sometimes analyzed as being prevoiced /ˬtsʰ/ and /ˬtsʼ/, though the cessation of voicing has also been analyzed as phonetic detail in the transition of a phonemically voiced consonant to its voiceless aspiration or ejection. (See aspirated voiced consonant and voiced ejective.)

Kelabit has a similar set of aspirated voiced consonants. Not all speakers produce the aspiration, resulting in prevoiced (or mixed voiced) [b͡p, d͡t, ɡ͡k] (or equivalently [ ˬp, ˬt, ˬk], and neighboring Lun Dayeh has [b͡p, d͡tʃ, ɡ͡k] (= [ ˬp, ˬtʃ, ˬk].
