= Lun Bawang language =

Austronesian language spoken on Borneo

Lun Bawang
- Lundayeh, Southern Murut
- Buri' Tau, Buri' Lun Bawang
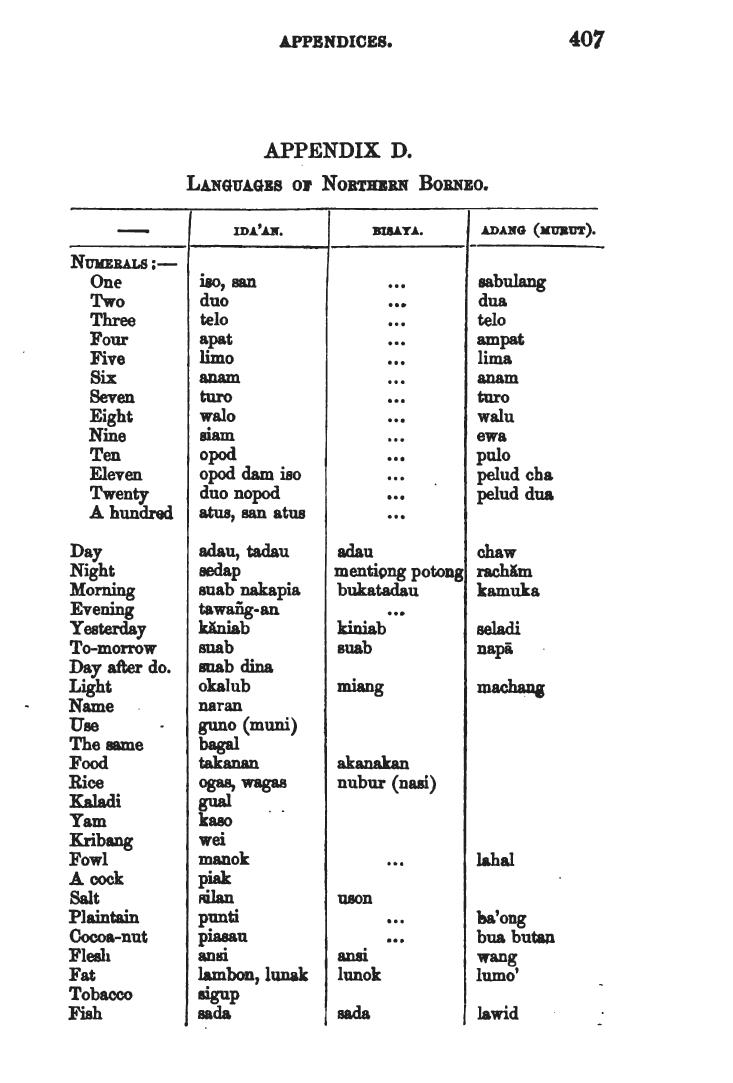
- Collection of words in English and translation in Ida'an, Bisaya and Adang Murut (Lun Bawang) in 1860 by Spenser St. John
- Native to: Malaysia, Brunei, Indonesia
- Region: Sarawak, Sabah, Temburong, North Kalimantan
- Native speakers: (48,000 (2007 in Indonesia; no date Malaysia) plus 6,000 Putoh cited 1981)
- Language family: Austronesian: Malayo-Polynesian; North Bornean; North Sarawakan; Apo Duat; Lun Bawang
- Dialects: Lun Dayeh

Language codes
- ISO 639-3: lnd – inclusive code Individual code: put – Putoh
- Glottolog: lund1271
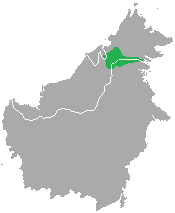
- Geographical distribution of Lun Bawang/Lundayeh speakers

Buri' Tau also called the Lun Bawang language, Lundayeh language and Putoh is the language spoken by the Lun Bawangs in northern Borneo. It belongs to the Malayo-Polynesian family.

== History ==
Lun Bawang among the languages of Kalimantan (code lnd, light red #30, top)

Lun Bawang is mainly an oral language. There is very little printed written material in this language that was not written by missionaries or linguists. The first published material written fully in Lun Bawang is a translation of the Bible from 1982, which is called Bala Luk Do. A Lun Bawang–English dictionary was constructed in 1969 by the University of Washington. A dialect of the Lun Bawang language, Kemaloh Lundayeh, was compiled in 2006 into a bilingual dictionary of Lundayeh and English.

== Phonology ==
There are 6 vowels, 19 consonants and 5 diphthongs in the Lun Bawang language.

Lun Bawang consonant phonemes
	Bilabial			Dental	Alveolar	Post- Alveolar	Palatal	Velar			Glottal
Nasal	m /m/				n /n/			ng /ŋ/			
Plosive	p /p/	b /b/	bp /b͡p/	t /t̪/	d /d/			k /k/	g /ɡ/	gk /ɡ͡k/	/ʔ/
Affricate						c /d͡tʃ/					
Fricative					s /s/						h /h/
Approximant					l /l/	r /r/	y /j/	w /w/			

According to Blust (2006), Lun Dayeh has a series of mixed-voiced stops, [b͡p, d͡tʃ, ɡ͡k], similar to those of Kelabit, but does not have a simple [tʃ].

Lun Bawang vowel phonemes
Height	Front	Central	Back
Close	i /i/		u /u/
Mid	e /e, ɛ/	e /ə/	o /o, ɔ/
Open		a /a/	

Lun Bawang diphthongs
Orthography	IPA
ai	/ai̯/
au	/au̯/
ia	/i̯a/
ou	/ou̯/
ui, oi	/ɔʏ̯/

== Example ==
=== Lord's Prayer (Our Father) ===
O Taman kai luk bang surga, dó ngadan-Mu uen ngerayeh. Idi imet-Mu uen ngaching, idi luk pian-Mu mangun bang taná kudeng bang surga. Maré nekai acho sini akan luk petap. Idi maré dó ratnan amung-amung baleh kai mepad kudeng kai pangeh nemaré ddó ratnan amung-amung baleh dulun. Idi aleg nguit nekai amé bang luk nutun, iamdó muit nekai ratnan luk dat. Amen. Ngacheku Iko luk kuan imet idi lalud idi rayeh maching ruked-ruked peh. Amen.

Translation:

Our Father, who art in heaven, hallowed be thy name. Thy kingdom come, Thy will be done on earth as it is in heaven. Give us this day our daily bread, and forgive us our sins, as we forgive those who sin against us. Do not lead us into temptation, but deliver us from evil. Amen. For the kingdom, the power, and the glory, are Yours now and forever. Amen. (Matthew 6:9–13)

== Bibliography ==
- Blust, Robert (2016). "Kelabit-Lun Dayeh Phonology, with Special Reference to the Voiced Aspirates". Oceanic Linguistics. 55 (1): 246–277. doi:10.1353/ol.2016.0010. S2CID 148388653.
- Clayre, Beatrice (1972). "A preliminary comparative study of the Lun Bawang (Murut) and Sa’ban languages of Sarawak". Sarawak Museum Journal 20: 40-41, 45-47.
- Clayre, Beatrice (2014). "A preliminary typology of the languages of Middle Borneo." In Advances in research on cultural and linguistic practices in Borneo, edited by Peter Sercombe, Michael Boutin and Adrian Clynes, 123–151. Phillips, Maine USA: Borneo Research Council.
- Coluzzi, Paolo (2010). "Endangered Languages in Borneo: A Survey Among the Iban and Murut (lun Bawang) in Temburong, Brunei". Oceanic Linguistics. 49 (1): 119–143. doi:10.1353/ol.0.0063. S2CID 144349072.
- Crain, JB (1982). "A Lun Dayeh Engagement Negotiation in Studies of Ethnic Minority Peoples." Contributions to Southeast Asian Ethnography Singapour (1):142-178.
- Deegan, James (1970). "Some Lun Bawang Spirit Chants." The Sarawak Museum Journal 18 (36–37):264–280.
- Deegan, James, and Robin Usad (1972). "Upai Kasan: A Lun Bawang Folktale". Sarawak Museum Journal 20:107–144.
- Ganang, Ricky, Jay Bouton Crain, and Vicki Pearson-Rounds (2008). Kemaloh Lundayeh-English Dictionary: And, Bibliographic List of Materials Relating to the Lundayeh-Lun Bawang-Kelabit and Related Groups of Sarawak, Sabah, Brunei and East Kalimantan. Vol. 1: Borneo Research Council.
- Garman, M. A., Griffiths, P. D., & Wales, R. J. (1970). Murut (Lun Buwang) prepositions and noun particles in children's speech. Sarawak Museum Journal, 18, 353–376.
- Lees, Shirley. 1959. "Lun Daye Phonemics". Sarawak Museum Journal 9/13-14: 56–62
- Martin, Peter W. (1995). "Whiter the Indigenous Languages of Brunei Darussalam?". Oceanic Linguistics. 34 (1): 27–43. doi:10.2307/3623110. JSTOR 3623110.
- Omar, A. H. (1983). The Malay peoples of Malaysia and their languages. Dewan Bahasa dan Pustaka, Kementerian Pelajaran Malaysia.
- Southwell, C. Hudson (1949). ‘The Structure of the Murut Language’. Sarawak Museum Journal 5: 104–115.
