= Bernd J. Kröger =

Bernd J. Kröger (German: [ˈbɛʁnt jɔt ˈkʁøːɡɐ]; born 1959 in Osnabrück, Germany) is a German phonetician and professor at RWTH Aachen University. He is known for his contributions in the field of neurocomputational speech processing, in particular the ACT model.

Kröger received his master's degree in physics from the University of Münster in 1985, his PhD degree in phonetics from the University of Cologne under the supervision of Georg Heike in 1989, and his habilitation in phonetics from the same university in 1997.

In 1987 Kröger started his academic career as research associate at Cologne's Department of Phonetics, which was then headed by Georg Heike. He became assistant professor in Cologne in 1990, and was guest professor at Berlin's Humboldt University in 1999. Since 2001 he has been professor and senior researcher at the Department of Phoniatrics, Pedaudiology and Communication Disorders, Medical School, RWTH Aachen University. He has been guest professor at Tianjin University, China since 2011.

== Selected writings ==
Books and articles, a selection:

- 1989. Co-authored by G. Heike, R. Greisbach and S. Hilger: Speech synthesis by acoustic control. Proceedings of Eurospeech 1989, p. 2020–2022
- 1991. Co-authored by G. Heike and R. Greisbach: Coarticulation rules in an articulatory model. Journal of Phonetics 19, p. 465–471.
- 1993. A gestural production model and its application to reduction in German. Phonetica 50: p. 213-233.
- 1995. Co-authored by G. Schröder and C. Opgen-Rhein: A gesture-based dynamic model describing articulatory movement data. Journal of the Acoustical Society of America 98: p. 1878-1889.
- 1998. Ein phonetisches Modell der Sprachproduktion. Niemeyer-Verlag, Tübingen.
- 2000. Co-authored by R. Winkler, C. Mooshammer and B. Pompino-Marschall. Estimation of vocal tract area function from magnetic resonance imaging: Preliminary results. Proceedings of 5th Seminar on Speech Production: Models and Data. Kloster Seeon, Bavaria. p. 333-336.
- 2003. Ein visuelles Modell der Artikulation. Laryngo-Rhino-Otologie 82: p. 402-407.
- 2004. Co-authored by P. Hoole, R. Sader, C. Geng, B. Pompino-Marschall and C. Neuschaefer-Rube: MRT-Sequenzen als Datenbasis eines visuellen Artikulationsmodells. HNO 52: 837–843.
- 2007. Co-authored by P. Birkholz: A gesture-based concept for speech movement control in articulatory speech synthesis. In: Esposito A, Faundez-Zanuy M, Keller E, Marinaro M (eds.) Verbal and Nonverbal Communication Behaviours, LNAI 4775. Springer, Berlin, p. 174–189.
- 2009. Co-authored by J. Kannampuzha and C. Neuschaefer-Rube: Towards a neurocomputational model of speech production and perception. Speech Communication 51: p. 793-809.
- 2011. Co-authored by P. Birkholz and C. Neuschaefer-Rube: Towards an articulation-based developmental robotics approach for word processing in face-to-face communication. PALADYN Journal of Behavioral Robotics 2: p. 82-93.
- 2013. Co-authored by S. Heim: How could a self-organizing associative speech action repository (SAR) be represented in the brain? Hallesche Schriften zur Sprechwissenschaft und Phonetik 45: p. 61-68.
- 2014. Co-authored by J. Kannampuzha and E. Kaufmann: Associative learning and self-organization as basic principles for simulating speech acquisition, speech production, and speech perception. EPJ Nonlinear Biomedical Physics 2:2 (Springer)
- 2016. Co-authored by E. Crawford, T. Bekolay and C. Eliasmith: Modeling Interactions between Speech Production and Perception: Speech Error Detection at Semantic and Phonological Levels and the Inner Speech Loop. Frontiers in Computational Neuroscience 10:51

URL=http://www.frontiersin.org/Journal/Abstract.aspx?s=237&name=computational_neuroscience&ART_DOI=10.3389/fncom.2016.00051%5B‍%5D DOI=10.3389/fncom.2016.00051
