= Zuni phonology =

Phonology of the Zuni language

The phonology of the Zuni language as spoken in the southwestern United States is described here. Phonology is a branch of linguistics that studies how languages or dialects systematically organize their sounds (or constituent parts of signs, in sign languages).

== Consonants ==
The 16 consonants of Zuni:

| | | Bila -bial | Dental/ Alveolar | | Post -alv. | Pala -tal | Velar | | Glot- tal |
| | | Bila -bial | med. | lat. | Post -alv. | Pala -tal | plain | lab. | Glot- tal |
|---|---|---|---|---|---|---|---|---|---|
| Nasal | | m | n | | | | | | |
| Stop | plain | p | t | | | (kʲ) | k | kʷ | ʔ |
| Stop | ejective | | | | | | (kʼ) | (kʼʷ) | |
| Affricate | plain | | ts | | tʃ | | | | |
| Affricate | ejective | | (tsʼ) | | (tʃʼ) | | | | |
| Fricative | | | s | ɬ | ʃ | | | | h |
| Approximant | | | | l | | j | | w | |

- /t/ is dental; /ts, s, n/ are alveolar; /l/ is apical.
- /ts, tʃ, k, kʷ/ are phonetically aspirated, [tsʰ, tʃʰ, kʰ, kʷʰ], while /p, t, ʔ/ are unaspirated.
- A sequence of a stop or affricate and a glottal stop /ʔ/ is phonetically realized as an ejective. This pronunciation occurs within words and across word boundaries: /ʔaːtʃ ʔuluka/ ('they two put it in') as [ʔaːtʃʼulucʰæ]. Some analyses have proposed that the sequences /tsʔ, tʃʔ, kʔ, kʷʔ/ be considered single ejective consonant phonemes /tsʼ, tʃʼ, kʼ, kʼʷ/ based on their phonotactic properties. (Note: See Davis (1966), Newman (1965), Newman (1967), Walker (1966b), Walker (1972).)
- /k/ and /kʷ/ contrast only before /i, e, a/; before /u, o/ the contrast is neutralized to /k/. This neutralization of contrast also applies to the sequences /kʔ, kʷʔ/.
- /k, kʷ/ are palatal [c, cʷ] before the vowels /i, e, a/, but are velar elsewhere. Since /k/ is realized as an ejective before a glottal stop, the sequences /kʔi, kʔe, kʔa/ are phonetically [cʼi, cʼɛ, cʼæ].
- In a sequence of a stop or affricate plus another consonant (except /ʔ/), the stop/affricate has no audible release. That is, /moktʃinne/ ('elbow') is phonetically [mɔk̚tʃʰinːɛ] and not [mɔkʰtʃʰinːɛ].
- All Zuni consonants occur with contrastive duration: short or long. In Stanley Newman's analysis, the phonetically long consonants are geminates (that is, a sequence of two identical consonants) Walker (1972). analyze length /ː/ as a separate phoneme. Geminate affricates are realized with a long closure period and a fricative release, e.g. /tsts/ as [tːs], /tʃtʃ/ as [tːʃ].
- /h/ is phonetically a voiceless vowel [h], except when following a consonant in which case it is a velar fricative [x]: /ʔahha/ ('pick it up!') is phonetically [ʔahxa].
- The sonorants /m, n, l, w, j/ (as well as vowels, see below) are optionally devoiced when followed by /h, ʔ/. The devoicing occurs within words and across word boundaries. This is especially common when also preceded by a voiceless consonant (in addition to the following /h, ʔ/): /lesn hol/ ('thus perhaps') pronounced [lɛsn̥hɔl].
- /n/ is optionally realized as a phonetic velar [ŋ] before /k, kʷ/.
- There is a marginal contrast between palatal [c] and velar [k] before the low vowel /a/. The usual pronunciation of /k/ before /a/ is palatal [c]. However, in some words — all of which are probably loanwords — a velar [k] occurs before /a/ (notably in the very common word, /melika/ ('non-Mormon Anglo-American'), which is phonetically [mɛlikʰa] and not [mɛlicʰæ]). This has led to an analysis of Zuni having two dorsal phonemes, /kʲ/ and /k/, by some linguists. A discussion of the disagreement between analyses and range of social variation of certain forms are discussed in Tedlock (1969). (Note: The other articles are Davis (1966), Newman (1967), Michaels (1971), Walker (1966b), Walker (1972).)

== Vowels ==
| | Front | back |
|---|---|---|
| High | i iː | u uː |
| Mid | e eː | o oː |
| Low | a aː | |

- High /i, u/ are typically [i, u], but lowered variants [ɪ, ʊ] may be heard in unstressed syllables.
- Mid /e, o/ are typically [ɛ, ɔ], but in unstressed syllables raised variants occur before glides with matching backness: [e] before /j/, [o] before /w/.
- Low central /a/, unlike the other vowels, is not reported to have allophonic variation by Newman. However Walker (1972), reports its realization as fronted [æ] when it follows /k/ (phonetically: [c]).
- All vowels occur with contrastive duration: short or long. In Newman's analysis, the phonetically long vowels are analyzed as distinct phonemes Walker (1972). analyzes length /ː/ as a separate phoneme.
- Long /eː, oː/ are typically [ɛː, ɔː], but close variants [eː, oː] can occur in fast speech.
- The other long vowels do not have variants with differing vowel quality.
- Short vowels are optionally voiceless [i̥, ɛ̥, ḁ, ɔ̥, u̥] when at the end of an utterance, e.g. the word /ʔaɬka/ in /ʔitʃunan si ʔaɬka/ ('after lying down then he slept') may be pronounced either [ʔaɬcʰæ̥] or [ʔaɬcʰæ]. Additionally, a short vowel or a sequence of a short vowel and glottal stop that occurs at the end of a word with more than one syllable is deleted when followed by a word that starts with /h, ʔ/ (see also the devoicing of sonorant consonants above), e.g. /ʔaːtʃi hinina/ ('they two are the same') as [ʔaːtʃhinina] (cf. /ʔaːtʃi jeːlahka/ 'the two of them ran' where the final /i/ of /ʔaːtʃi/ is not deleted), and /ʔasselaʔ ʔelaje/ ('they two are the same') as [ʔasːɛlʔɛlajɛ] (cf. /ʔasselaʔ powaje/ 'the two of them ran' where the final /aʔ/ of /ʔasselaʔ/ is not deleted).

== Syllable and phonotactics ==
Zuni syllables have the following specification:

C_{1}(C_{2})V(ː)(C_{3})(C_{4})

That is, all syllables must start with a consonant in the syllable onset. The onset may optionally have two consonants. The syllable coda is optional and may consist of a single consonant or two consonants. There are restrictions on the combinations with long vowels, which are listed below.

Onset. When the onset is a single consonant (i.e., CV(ː), CV(ː)C, or CV(ː)CC), C_{1} may be any consonant. When the onset is a two consonant cluster (i.e., CCV(ː), CCV(ː)C, or CCV(ː)CC), C_{1} may only be /ts, tʃ, k, kʷ/, and C_{2} may only be /ʔ/. These onset clusters can occur word-initially.

Nucleus. Any vowel of either length may be the syllable nucleus when open (i.e., has no coda: CV(ː) or CCV(ː)) or with a single consonant coda (i.e., CV(ː)C or CCV(ː)C). When the coda consists of two consonant cluster, the nucleus may be any short vowel; however, long vowels only occur with coda consisting of /tsʔ, tʃʔ, kʔ, kʷʔ/. (Note: Newman (1965) reports only /kʔ/ after long vowels, but further fieldwork by Walker (1966b) also finds /tsʔ, tʃʔ, kʷʔ/.)

Coda. A single coda C_{3} may be any consonant. When the coda is a two consonant cluster (i.e., CV(ː)CC or CCV(ː)CC), any combination of consonants may occur with the following exception: if C_{3} is /ts, tʃ, kʷ/, then C_{4} can only be either /ʔ/ or an identical consonant (C_{3} = C_{4}).

Non-tautosyllabic combinations. Inside words, a short vowel plus a two consonant coda (i.e., CVCC or CCVCC) may only be followed by a syllable with a /ʔ/ onset. Likewise, a long vowel plus a single consonant coda (i.e., CVːC or CCVːC) may only be followed by a /ʔ/ onset. An open syllable (i.e., CV(ː) or CCV(ː)) and a short vowel plus a single consonant coda (i.e., CVC or CCVC) may be followed by a syllable with any possible onset.

== Prosody ==
At the word level, the first syllable of lexical words receive stress. Although the acoustic correlates of stress are not fully described in Newman's grammar, at least vowel length is a significant correlate: short vowels are lengthened under syllable-initial stress. Stressed long vowels do not appear to have perceptible variation in duration.

Stress at the phrase level was not fully studied by Newman, and, therefore, its details are not well known. Pronouns and certain particles consisting of a single syllable are unstressed when inside clauses, but are stressed at the beginning of phrases.

== Bibliography ==
- Davis, Irvine (1966), "Review of Zuni grammar by Stanley Newman", International Journal of American Linguistics, 32: 82–84, doi:10.1086/464883
- Michaels, David (1971), "A note on some exceptions in Zuni phonology", International Journal of American Linguistics, 37 (3): 189–191, doi:10.1086/465159, S2CID 144460775
- Newman, Stanley (1965), Zuni grammar, University of New Mexico publications in anthropology, vol. 14, Albuquerque: University of New Mexico
- Newman, Stanley (1967), "Zuni grammar: Alternative solutions versus weaknesses", International Journal of American Linguistics, 33 (3): 187–192, doi:10.1086/464959, S2CID 144980446
- Tedlock, Dennis (1969), "The problem of k in Zuni phonemics", International Journal of American Linguistics, 35: 67–71, doi:10.1086/465044, S2CID 145544319
- Walker, Willard (January–March 1966a), "Review: [Zuni grammar by Stanley Newman]", Language, 42 (1): 176–180, doi:10.2307/411614, JSTOR 411614
- Walker, Willard (July 1966b), "Inflection and taxonomic structure in Zuni", International Journal of American Linguistics, 32 (3): 217–227, doi:10.1086/464906, S2CID 144301852
- Walker, Willard (1972), "Toward the sound pattern of Zuni", International Journal of American Linguistics, 38 (4): 240–259, doi:10.1086/465223, S2CID 143863446
