= Georg Heike =

German phonetician and linguist

Georg Heike (German: [ˈɡeːɔʁk ˈhaɪkə]; July 21, 1933 – January 15, 2023) was a German phonetician and linguist.

He studied musicology, phonetics, communication science and psychology at the University of Bonn and finished his doctoral thesis in 1960 at the Department of Phonetics and Communication Research headed by Prof. Dr. Werner Meyer-Eppler. He was senior scientist at Marburg University before he moved to the University of Cologne. From 1969 to 1998 he headed the Departement of Phonetics at the University of Cologne. Among his topics of research are phonetics, phonology, articulatory synthesis, musicology.

Georg Heike has also been intensively involved in composing and performing contemporary music, violin making, and musical acoustics.

== Major research topics of Georg Heike ==
- Development of a German articulatory speech synthesis system.
- Dialectology (Stadtkölner Mundart)
- Aesthetic Phonetics Cf. Heike, G (1998) "Musiksprache und Sprachmusik. Schriften zur Musik 1956-98" (Pfau, Saarbrücken)

== Selected references on his work in phonetics ==
- Heike G (1960) Über das phonologische System der Stadtkölner Mundart. Zeitschrift für Phonetik 14, 1–20
- Heike G (1964) Zur Phonologie der Stadtkölner Mundart. Eine experimentelle Untersuchung der akustischen Unterscheidungsmerkmale. Deutsche Dialektgeographie 57 (Elwert, Marburg)
- Heike G (1969) Suprasegmentale Analyse. In: Marburger Beiträge zur Germanistik No. 30, (Elwert, Marburg)
- Heike G, Hall RD (1969) Vowel patterns of three English speakers: a comparative and auditive description. Linguistics 7, 13–38
- Heike G (1979) Articulatory Measurement and Synthesis, Phonetica 36, 294–301
- Heike G (1972) Phonologie (Sammlung Metzler Band 104, Stuttgart)
- Heike G (1987) 'Coarticulation' in an articulatory synthesis model of German. Proceedings of the 11th International Congress of Phonetic Sciences, Vol 1: 214–216 (Tallinn)
- Heike G, Greisbach R, Hilger S, Kröger BJ (1989) Speech synthesis by acoustic control. Proceedings of Eurospeech 1989, pp. 2020–2022 (Paris)
- Heike G, Greisbach R, Kröger BJ (1991) Coarticulation rules in an articulatory model. Journal of Phonetics 19, 465–471
