= Frank H. Guenther =

American neuroscientist

Frank H. Guenther (born April 18, 1964, Kansas City, MO) is an American computational and cognitive neuroscientist whose research focuses on the neural computations underlying speech, including characterization of the neural bases of communication disorders and development of brain–computer interfaces for communication restoration. He is currently a professor of speech, language, and hearing sciences and biomedical engineering at Boston University.

== Education ==
Frank Guenther received a B.S. in electrical engineering from the University of Missouri in Columbia (1986), graduating summa cum laude and ranking first overall in the College of Engineering. He received an M.S. in electrical engineering from Princeton University (1987) and a Ph.D. in cognitive and neural systems from Boston University (1993).

== Professional ==
In 1992, Guenther joined the faculty of the Cognitive & Neural Systems Department at Boston University, receiving tenure in 1998. In 2010 he became associate director of the graduate program for neuroscience and director of the computational neuroscience PhD specialization at Boston University. He joined the Department of Speech, Language, & Hearing Sciences at BU that same year. In addition to his Boston University appointments, Guenther was a research affiliate in the Research Laboratory of Electronics at Massachusetts Institute of Technology from 1998 to 2011, and in 2011 he became a research affiliate in the Picower Institute for Learning and Memory at MIT. Since 1998 he has been a member of the Speech and Hearing Bioscience and Technology PhD program in the Harvard University – MIT Division of Health Sciences and Technology, and since 2003 he has been a visiting scientist in the Department of Radiology at Massachusetts General Hospital. Guenther has given numerous keynote and distinguished lectures worldwide and has authored over 55 refereed journal articles concerning the neural bases of speech and motor control as well as brain–computer interface technology.

== Research ==
Frank Guenther's research is aimed at uncovering the neural computations underlying the processing of speech by the human brain. He is the originator of the Directions Into Velocities of Articulators (DIVA) model, which is currently the leading model of the neural computations underlying speech production. This model mathematically characterizes the computations performed by each brain region involved in speech production as well as the function of the interconnections between these regions. The model has been supported by a wide range of experimental tests of model predictions, including electromagnetic articulometry studies investigating speech movements, auditory perturbation studies involving modification of a speaker's feedback of his/her own speech in real time, and functional magnetic resonance imaging studies of brain activity during speech, though some parts of the model remain to be experimentally verified. The DIVA model has been used to investigate the neural underpinnings of a number of communication disorders, including stuttering apraxia of speech, and hearing-impaired speech.

In addition to computational modeling and experimental research investigating the neural bases of speech, Guenther directs the Boston University Neural Prosthesis Laboratory, which focuses on the development of technologies that can decode the brain signals of profoundly paralyzed individuals, particularly those with locked-in syndrome, in order to control external devices such as speech synthesizers, mobile robots, and computers. Guenther's team received widespread press coverage in 2009, when they developed a brain–computer interface for real-time speech synthesis that allowed locked-in patient Erik Ramsey to produce vowel sounds in collaboration with Dr. Philip Kennedy (inventor of the neurotrophic electrode used in the study) and Dr. Jonathan Brumberg. He has also made headlines for his research into non-invasive brain–computer interfaces for communication. In 2011, Guenther founded the Unlock Project, a non-profit project aimed at providing free brain–computer interface technology to patients with locked-in syndrome.

== Media ==
Frank Guenther's research has been covered extensively in the science and mainstream media, including television spots on CNN News, PBS NewsHour, and Fox News; articles in popular science magazines Nature News, New Scientist, Discover, and Scientific American; and mainstream media coverage in Esquire, Wired, The Boston Globe, MSNBC, and BBC News.
