= Phonetotopy =

Phonetotopy is the concept that articulatory features as well as perceptual features of speech sounds are ordered in the brain in a similar way as tone (tonotopy), articulation and its somatosensory feedback (somatotopy), or visual location of an object (retinotopy). It is assumed that a phonetotopic ordering of speech sounds as well as of syllables can be found at a supramodal speech processing level (i.e. at a phonetic speech processing level) within the brain.

The concept of phonetotopy was introduced in Kröger et al. (2009) on the basis of modeling speech production, speech perception, as well as speech acquisition. Moreover, fMRI measurements on ordering of vowels with respect to phonetic features as well as EEG-array measurements on vowel and syllable articulation support this concept. It underpins the concept of distinctive features, which are phonetically based features of speech sounds (i.e. based in perceptual as well as in articulatory domain), but which as well are linguistically (or phonologically) relevant, and thus are realized in a language specific way in humans.
