= Motor goal =

A motor goal is a neurally planned motor outcome that is used to organize motor control.

Motor goals are experimentally shown to exist since planned movements can when disrupted adjust to achieve their planned outcome. If, for example, a person makes a movement of their hand to touch or grasp something and unexpected their arm is pushed – their brain automatically reorganizes the movement so it so achieves its intended aim. This also occurs if an arm is perturbed which results in an automatic correction that enables it to fulfill its planned spatial-temporal target. If a lip articulating a consonant is knocked, the vocal apparatus makes a target related correction of movement. Spoken words are sequences of motor movements organized around motor targets. The motor cortex is involved in such compensatory adjustment of speech articulation.
