= Leonard Katz =

American experimental psychologist

Leonard Katz (1938–2017) was an American experimental psychologist, born in Boston, Massachusetts. He was a professor of psychology at the University of Connecticut (1965–2006) and then professor emeritus until 2017. He was a Fellow of the American Association for the Advancement of Science and the Association for Psychological Science.

== Education ==
B.A. and Ph.D. (1963) from the University of Massachusetts Amherst. Postdoctoral training at Stanford University (1963–1965).

== Career ==
In the late 1960s, he applied the emerging concepts and experimental techniques of the new cognitive psychology to study children's reading. In 1974 he joined Haskins Laboratories, where he collaborated with Isabelle Liberman, Donald Shankweiler, and others in the Haskins program that studied the relationships between speech and reading, particularly the idea that phonological awareness of speech is instrumental in developing skilled reading. At the time, the prevailing method of teaching reading in the primary school grades was the whole word method. The Haskins Labs research spearheaded an educational reform that introduced a modern version of the phonics method of teaching reading, largely replacing the older approach (Liberman, I. Y. & Shankweiler, D. (1979). Speech, the alphabet and teaching to read. In L. B. Resnik & P. A. Weaver (Eds.), Theory and practice of early reading. Hillsdale, NJ: Erlbaum).

His early work studied the cognitive processes involved in reading English but soon was extended to include studies of reading in other alphabetic writing systems (French, Spanish, Turkish, Russian, Serbian, Hebrew, Korean) and a nonalphabetic system (Chinese). With R. Frost, he developed the Orthographic Depth Hypothesis to explain printed word reading. The ODH accounted for the cognitive processing balance between letter decoding and the processing of larger text clusters as a function of the degree of isomorphism between a writing system's letters and phonemes.

By the 1990s, he was a member of teams (led by Bennett and Sally Shaywitz at Yale and Ken Pugh at Yale and Haskins) that utilized brain-scan data from MRI, fMRI, and MRS to study reading. That work, together with the work of many other researchers, established the outlines of the brain's mechanisms involved in processing printed words. In addition to his research activity, he has been a resource consultant at UConn, Haskins, and various governmental and private research projects on issues of experimental design and statistical analysis.

== Selected publications ==
- Katz, L.; Wicklund, D. A. (1971). "Word scanning rate for good and poor readers". Journal of Educational Psychology. 62: 138–140.
- Katz, L., & Feldman, L. B. (1981). Linguistic coding in word recognition: Comparisons between a deep and a shallow orthography. In A. Lesgold & C. Perfetti, Interactive Processes in reading. Hillsdale. NJ: Erlbaum.
- Katz, L. & Frost, R. (1992). The reading process is different for different orthographies: The orthographic depth hypothesis. In Frost, R. & Katz, L., (Eds.). Orthography, Phonology, Morphology, and Meaning, pp. 67–84. Amsterdam: Elsevier North Holland Press.
- Katz, L. (2005). Dyslexia. In Philipp Skutch (Ed.), Encyclopedia of Linguistics. New York: Routledge,. 2 volumes. (ISBN 1-57958-391-1.)
- Katz, L.; Lee, C.H.; Tabor, W.; Frost, S. J.; Mencl, W. E.; Sandak, R.; Rueckl, J.; Pugh, K. R. (2005). "Behavioral and Neurobiological Effects of Printed Word Repetition in Lexical Decision and Naming". Neuropsychologia. 43: 2068–2083.
- Katz, L. (2011). The neurobiology of reading and writing. In P. C. Hogan (Ed.), The Cambridge Encyclopedia of the Language Sciences, 932–934. New York: The Cambridge University Press.
- Katz, L.; Brancazio, L.; Irwin, J.; Katz, S.; Magnuson, J.; Whalen, D. (2012). "What lexical decision and naming tell us about reading". Reading and Writing. 25: 1259–1282. doi:10.1007/s11145-011-9316-9. PMC 3383646. PMID 22754142.
- Braze, D.; Katz, L.; Magnuson, J. S.; Mencl, W. E.; Tabor, W.; Van Dyke, J. A.; Gong, T.; Johns, C. L.; Shankweiler, D. P. (2016). "Vocabulary does not complicate the Simple View of Reading". Reading and Writing. 29 (3): 435–451. doi:10.1007/s11145-015-9608-6. PMC 4761369.
