= Nicholas Rescher =

American philosopher (1928–2024)

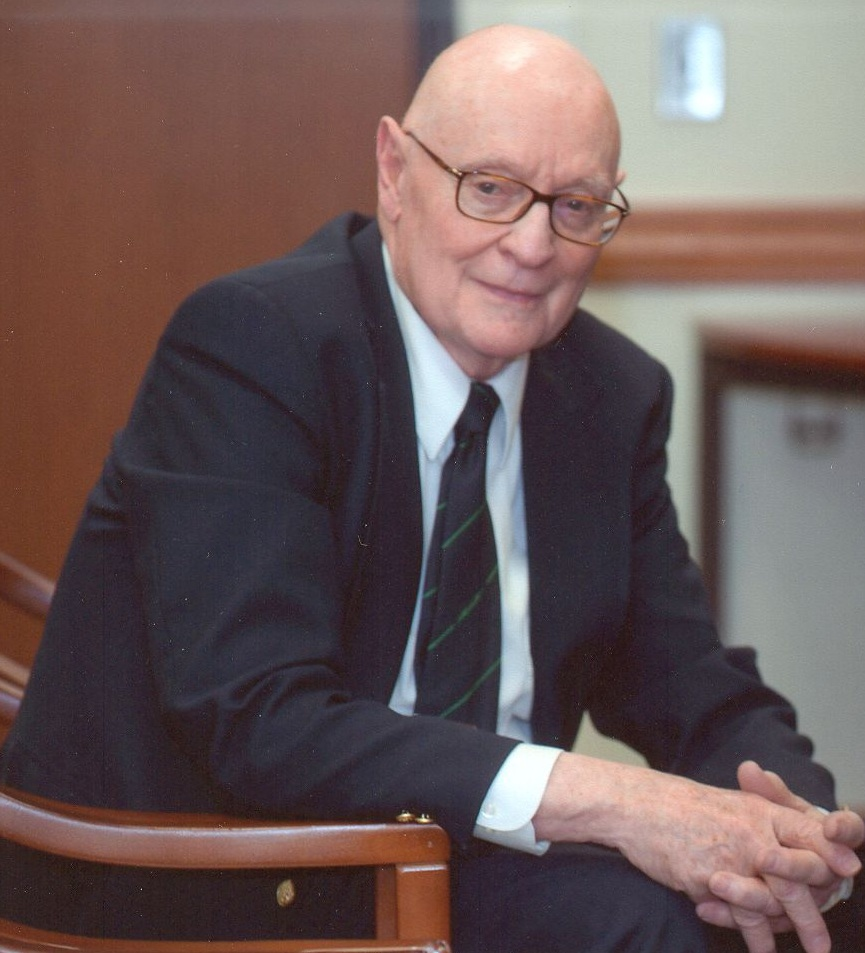
- Born: 15 July 1928; Hagen, Westphalia, Prussia, Germany
- Died: 5 January 2024 (aged 95); Pittsburgh, Pennsylvania, U.S.

Education
- Education: Queens College (CUNY); Princeton University
- Thesis: Leibniz' cosmology: a reinterpretation of the philosophy of Leibniz in the light of his physical theories (1951)
- Doctoral advisor: Alonzo Church; Ledger Wood

Philosophical work
- Era: Contemporary philosophy
- Region: Western philosophy
- School: Analytic; Process philosophy Methodological pragmatism Pragmatic idealism Conceptual idealism Epistemic coherentism Coherence theory of truth
- Institutions: University of Pittsburgh
- Doctoral students: Diego Marconi; Alexander Pruss; Ernest Sosa; Brian Skyrms
- Main interests: Philosophy of subjectivity, history of philosophy, epistemology, value theory
- Notable ideas: Philosophical theory of everything, axiogenesis

Nicholas Rescher (/ˈrɛʃər/; German: [ˈʁɛʃɐ]; 15 July 1928 – 5 January 2024) was a German-born American philosopher and author who was a professor of philosophy at the University of Pittsburgh from 1961. He was chairman of the Center for Philosophy of Science and chairman of the philosophy department.

Rescher served as president of the American Catholic Philosophical Association, Leibniz Society of North America, American Metaphysical Society, American Philosophical Association, and Charles S. Peirce Society. He was the founder of American Philosophical Quarterly, History of Philosophy Quarterly, and Public Affairs Quarterly. He died in Pittsburgh on January 5, 2024, at the age of 95.

== Early life and education ==
Rescher was born in Hagen in the Westphalia region of Germany. In his autobiography he traces his descent to Nehemias Rescher (1735–1801), a founder of the Hochberg-Remseck Jewish community in Swabian Germany. He relocated to the United States when he was 10 and became a naturalized United States citizen in 1944. In 1949 he obtained a degree in mathematics at Queens College, New York, thereafter attending Princeton University and graduating with a Ph.D. in philosophy in 1951 at the age of 22, the youngest person to earn a Ph.D. in that department. From 1952 to 1954 during the Korean War he served a term in the United States Marine Corps, and then from 1954 to 1957 he worked for the Rand Corporation's mathematics division. After a time at Lehigh University, he taught philosophy at the University of Pittsburgh starting in 1961. The orientalist Oskar Rescher is the first cousin of his father.

== Career ==
Rescher began his career as an academic at Princeton University in 1951. He joined the philosophy department at the University of Pittsburgh in 1961, becoming the first associate director of its new Center for Philosophy of Science the following year. In 1964, he founded the American Philosophical Quarterly. From 1980 to 1981, Rescher served as the chairman of the philosophy department. In July 1988, Rescher changed roles at the Center for Philosophy of Science, resigning as its director and becoming its chairman. In 2010, he donated his philosophy collection to the Hillman Library.

An honorary member of Corpus Christi College, Oxford, he was elected to membership in the American Academy of Arts and Sciences, the Royal Asiatic Society of Great Britain, the Academia Europaea, the Royal Society of Canada, and the Institut International de Philosophie, among others.

Rescher was a prolific writer, with over 100 books and 400 articles, generating the jest that Rescher is not a single person, but a committee sharing the name. Philosopher Michele Marsonet, who has published extensively on Rescher's philosophy, writes that his prolific publication is in itself the most common objection against Rescher, adding "it is, indeed, a leitmotiv of all those unwilling to discuss his ideas".

== Philosophy ==
Rescher's university biography describes his philosophical work thus:

His work envisions a dialectical tension between our synoptic aspirations for useful knowledge and our human limitations as finite inquirers. The elaboration of this project represents a many-sided approach to fundamental philosophical issues that weaves together threads of thought from the philosophy of science, and from continental idealism and American pragmatism.

He is known for his system of pragmatic idealism, which synthesizes British idealism with the pragmatism of the U.S. The original term he used for his system was conceptual idealism, an attempt to renew the idealist approach to knowledge in the domain of modern science.

In the mid and late 1960s, his studies were focused on medieval Arabic logic, but he soon broadened his areas of inquiry in metaphysics and epistemology, moving toward the methodological pragmatism he would define. In the 1970s, he began working more extensively with American pragmatism with a focus on the writings of C. S. Peirce, who was to number among his major influences. In 1966, Rescher collaborated with Herbert A. Simon on a ground-breaking paper on the theory of causality.

Rescher had contributed to futuristics, and with Olaf Helmer and Norman Dalkey, invented the Delphi method of forecasting. A lifelong aficionado of the philosophy of G. W. Leibniz, Rescher has been instrumental in the reconstruction of Leibniz's machina deciphratoria, an ancestor of the famous Enigma cipher machine. Rescher was also responsible for two further items of historical rediscovery and reconstruction: the model of cosmic evolution in Anaximander, and the medieval Islamic theory of modal syllogistic.

== Honors ==
Rescher was honored for his work. In 1984, he received the Humboldt Prize for Humanistic Scholarship. In 2005, he received the Cardinal Mercier Prize, and in 2007 the American Catholic Philosophical Society's Aquinas Medal. In 2011, his contributions as a German-American to philosophy were recognized with the premier cross of the Order of Merit of the Federal Republic of Germany, the Founder's Medal of the American Metaphysical Society (2016), and the Helmholtz Medal of the German Academy of Sciences Berlin-Brandenburg. He holds eight honorary degrees. Having held visiting lectureships at the University of Oxford, the University of Konstanz, the University of Salamanca, LMU Munich, and Marburg University, he has been awarded fellowships by the Ford, Guggenheim, and National Science Foundations. In April 2021, the University of Tehran held a session in his honor where Nadia Maftouni asserted:

Rescher's A Journey through Philosophy in 101 Anecdotes is a successful framework to reach a broader audience in the field. At first glance it seems an easy book to write. But at least in philosophy, it's easy to write in a complicated style and it's hard to write in a simple, clear, and readable fashion.

== Prize and medal ==
In 2010, the University of Pittsburgh created the Dr. Nicholas Rescher Fund for the Advancement of the Department of Philosophy which bestows the Nicholas Rescher Prize for Contributions to Systematic Philosophy. The first recipient of the prize was Rescher's former student, Ernest Sosa. As of 2012, the prize included a gold medal and $25,000, subsequently raised to $30,000. Later awardees have included Alvin Plantinga, Jürgen Mittelstraß, Hilary Putnam, Ruth Millikan, and Thomas Nagel. When the American Philosophical Association inaugurated its own Rescher Prize for Systematic Philosophy in 2018, the University of Pittsburgh redesignated its award as the Rescher Medal.

== Eponymous concepts ==
- Formal logic: Rescher quantifier
- Non-classical logic: Dienes–Rescher inference engine (also Rescher–Dienes implication); Rescher–Manor consequence relation
- Paraconsistent logic: Rescher–Brandom semantics
- Temporal logic: Rescher operator
- Scientometrics: Rescher's law of logarithmic returns
- Distributive justice: Rescher's effective average measure
- Dialectics: Rescher's theory of formal disputation
- Theory of luck: Rescher's luck equation

== Membership in learned societies ==
- Academia Europaea: European Academy of Arts and Sciences
- Academie Internationale de Philosophie des Sciences
- American Academy of Arts and Sciences
- Institut international de philosophie
- Pennsylvania Academy of Science
- Royal Asiatic Society of Great Britain and Ireland
- Royal Society of Canada

== Selected works ==
For a more complete list of publications (books) from 1960 to 2016, see the List of publications by Nicholas Rescher.

OUP = Oxford University Press. PUP = Princeton University Press. SUNY Press = State University of New York Press. UPA = University Press of America. UPP = University of Pittsburgh Press. UCP = University of California Press.

- 1964. The Development of Arabic Logic. UPP.
- 1966. Galen and the Syllogism. UPP.
- 1966. The Logic of Commands. Dover Publications, New York, Routledge & Kegan Paul, London.
- 1967. Studies in Arabic Philosophy. UPP.
- 1968. Topological Logic
- 1969. Introduction to Value Theory. (Reissued 1982) UPA.
- 1973. The Coherence Theory of Truth. (Reissued 1982) UPA.
- 1977. Methodological Pragmatism: A Systems-Theoretic Approach to the Theory of Knowledge. Basil Blackwell; New York University Press.
- 1978. Scientific Progress: A Philosophical Essay on the Economics of Research in Natural Science. UPP
- 1983. Risk: A Philosophical Introduction to the Theory of Risk Evaluation and Management. UPA.
- 1984. The Limits of Science. (Reissued 1999) UPP.
- 1985. The Strife of Systems: An Essay on the Grounds and Implications of Philosophical Diversity. UPP.
- 1987. Ethical Idealism : An Inquiry into the Nature and Function of Ideals. UCP
- 1988. Rationality. OUP.
- 1989. Cognitive Economy: Economic Perspectives in the Theory of Knowledge. UPP.
- 1989. A Useful Inheritance: Evolutionary Epistemology in Philosophical Perspective. Rowman & Littlefield.
- 1990. Human Interests: Reflections on Philosophical Anthropology. Stanford University Press.
- 1993. Pluralism: Against the Demand for Consensus. OUP.
- 1993 "In Matters of Religion," in Kelly James Clark, ed., Philosophers Who Believe: The Spiritual Journeys of 11 Leading Thinkers, pp. 127–136. InterVarsity Press.
- A System of Pragmatic Idealism
  - 1991. Volume I: Human Knowledge in Idealistic Perspective. PUP.
  - 1992. Volume II: The Validity of Values: Human Values in Pragmatic Perspective. PUP.
  - 1994. Volume III: Metaphilosophical Inquiries. PUP.
- 1995. Luck. Farrar, Straus & Giroux.
- 1995. Essays in the History of Philosophy. UK: Aldershot.
- 1995. Process Metaphysics. SUNY Press.
- 1996. Instructive Journey: An Autobiographical Essay. UPA.
- 1997. Predicting The Future: An Introduction To The Theory Of Forecasting. SUNY Press
- 1998. Complexity: A Philosophical Overview. Transaction Publishers.
- 1999. Kant and the Reach of Reason. Cambridge University Press.
- 1999. Realistic Pragmatism: An Introduction to Pragmatic Philosophy. SUNY Press.
- 2000. Nature and Understanding: A Study of the Metaphysics of Science. OUP.
- 2001. Paradoxes: Their Roots, Range, and Resolution. Open Court Publishing.
- 2001. Process Philosophy: A Survey of Basic Issues. UPP.
- 2003. Epistemology: On the Scope and Limits of Knowledge. SUNY Press.
- 2003. On Leibniz. UPP.
- 2005. Epistemic Logic. UPP.
- 2005. Reason and Reality: Realism and Idealism in Pragmatic Perspective. Rowman & Littlefield.
- 2005–2006. Collected Papers in 10 vols. Ontos.
- 2006. Metaphysics: The Key Issues from a Realist Perspective. Prometheus Books.
- 2006. Epistemetrics. Cambridge University Press.
- 2006. Error: On Our Predicament When Things Go Wrong. UPP.
- 2007. Conditionals. MIT Press.
- 2007. Dialectics: A Classical Approach to Inquiry. Ontos.
- 2009. Aporetics. UPP.
- 2009. Free Will. Transaction Books.
- 2009. Ignorance: On the Wider Implications of Deficient Knowledge. UPP.
- 2009. Unknowability. Lexington Books.
- 2009. Wishful Thinking and Other Philosophical Reflections. Ontos.
- 2009. Epistemological Studies. Ontos.
- 2010. Ideas in Process: A Study of the Development of Philosophical Concepts. Ontos.
- 2010. Studies in Quantitative Philosophy. Ontos.
- 2010. Reality and Its Appearance. Continuum.
- 2010. A Free Will Bibliography. Ontos. With Estelle Burris
- 2010. Philosophical Inquiries. UPP.
- 2010. Infinite Regress. Transaction Books
- 2010. Axiogenesis: An Essay in Metaphysical Optimalism. Lexington Books.
- 2010. Philosophical Textuality: Studies on Issues of Discourses in Philosophy. Ontos.
- 2010. On Rules and Principles: A Philosophical Study of their Nature and Function. Ontos.
- 2010. Finitude: A Study of Cognitive Limits and Limitations. Ontos.
- 2010. Beyond Sets: A Venture in Collection-Theoretico Revisionism. Ontos. With Patrick Grim.
- 2011. On Certainty: And Other Philosophical Essays. Ontos.
- 2011. Philosophical Explorations. Ontos.
- 2011. Philosophical Episodes. Ontos.
- 2011. Productive Evolution. Ontos.
- 2012. Pragmatism. Transaction Books.
- 2012. Reflexivity. (With Patrick Grim) Ontos.
- 2012. On Explaining Existence. Ontos.
- 2012. Philosophische Vorsellungen. Ontos.
- 2012. Philosophical Deliberations. Ontos.
- 2012. On Leibniz. UPP. [Second, revised and expanded edition of the 2003 edition.]
- 2012. Epistemic Merit: And Other Essays in Epistemology. Ontos.
- 2013. On Leibniz: Expanded Edition. University of Pittsburgh Press.
- 2013. Reason and Religion. ONTOS.
- 2014. Philosophical Progress, And Other Philosophical Studies. De Gruyter.
- 2014. The Pragmatic Vision: Themes in Philosophical Pragmatism. Rowman & Littlefield.
- 2014. Logical Inquiries. De Gruyter.
- 2014. The Vagaries of Value: Basic Issued in Value Theory. Transaction.
- 2014. Metaphilosophy. Lexington Books.
- 2015. A Journey through Philosophy in 101 Anecdotes. University of Pittsburgh Press.
- 2015. Ethical Considerations: Basic Issues in Moral Philosophy. Mellen Press.
- 2015. Cognitive Complications: Epistemology in Pragmatic Perspective. Lexington Books.
- 2016. Pragmatism in Philosophical Inquiry. Springer.
- 2016. Concept Audits: A Philosophical Method. Lexington Books.
- 2018. Leibniz Essays. LAP Lambert Academic Publishing.
- 2018. Philosophical Encounters. LAP Lambert Academic Publishing.
- 2018. Family Matters. LAP Lambert Academic Publishing.
- 2018. Kant Essays. LAP Lambert Academic Publishing.
- 2018. A Philosopher's Story: The Autobiography of an American Philosopher. LAP Lambert Academic Publishing.

== See also ==
- American philosophy
- List of American philosophers
- Delphi method
- Vagrant predicate
