= Hollis Scarborough =

American psychologist

Dr Hollis Scarborough is an American psychologist and literacy expert who is a senior scientist at Haskins Laboratories in New Haven, Connecticut. She has been a leading researcher in the area of reading acquisition since 1981, and has been involved with efforts to improve US national policy on the teaching of reading.

Scarborough was a member of the Committee on the Prevention of Reading Difficulties in Young Children, United States National Research Council, National Academy of Sciences (1996–1998). She sat on the board of directors of the Society for the Scientific Study of Reading from 1999 until 2007. She was associate editor of the journal Annals of Dyslexia from 1994 until 2002 and continues to be on the council of advisors to the International Dyslexia Association (IDA). In 2009, Scarborough shared the IDA's Samuel Torrey Orton award with Susan Brady. The Orton Award is the association's highest honor.

Scarborough developed the rope model to explain the complexity of reading comprehension and published this idea in 2001. The concept that skilled reading relies on the intertwining of both language comprehension and word recognition was illustrated using the "Reading Rope" infographic.

== Selected publications ==
- Charity, A. H., Scarborough, H. S., & Griffon, D. M. (2004). "Familiarity with "School English" in African American Children and its Relation to Early Reading Achievement", Child Development 75(5), 1340–1356.
- Clements-Stephens, A. M., Materek, A. D., Eason, S. H., Scarborough, H. S., Pugh, K. R., Rimrodt, S., et al. (2012). "Neural circuitry associated with two different approaches to novel word learning", Developmental Cognitive Neuroscience, 2, Supplement 1(0), S99-S113.
- Cutting, L. E., & Scarborough, H. S. (2006). "Prediction of Reading Comprehension: Relative Contributions of Word Recognition, Language Proficiency, and Other Cognitive Skills Can Depend on How Comprehension Is Measured", Scientific Studies of Reading, 10(3), 277–299.
- Dobrich, W., & Scarborough, H. S. (1992). Phonological characteristics of words young children try to say", Journal of Child Language, 19(3), 597–616.
- Fowler, A. E., & Scarborough, H. S. (1993). "Should reading disabled adults be distinguished from other adults seeking literacy instruction? A review of theory and research" (Technical Report No. 93-6). Philadelphia: University of Pennsylvania, National Center on Adult Literacy.
- Leach, J. M., Scarborough, H. S., & Rescorla, L. (2003). "Late-Emerging Reading Disabilities", Journal of Educational Psychology, 95(2), 211–224.
- McCardle, P., Scarborough, H. S., & Catts, H. W. (2001). "Predicting, explaining, and preventing children's reading difficulties", Learning Disabilities Research & Practice, 16(4), 230–239.
- Patton Terry, N., & Scarborough, H. S. (2011). "The Phonological Hypothesis as a valuable framework for studying the relation of dialect variation to early reading skills" in S. Brady, D. Braze & C. A. Fowler (eds.), Explaining Individual Differences in Reading: Theory and Evidence, Psychology Press.
- Sabatini, J. P., Sawaki, Y., Shore, J. R., & Scarborough, H. S. (2010). "Relationships among reading skills of adults with low literacy", Journal of Learning Disabilities, 43(2), 122–138.
- Scarborough, D. L., Cortese, C., & Scarborough, H. S. (1977). "Frequency and Repetition Effects in Lexical Memory", Journal of Experimental Psychology: Human Perception & Performance, 3(1), 1–17.
- Scarborough, H., & Wyckoff, J. (1986). ""Mother, I'd still rather do it myself: Some further non-effects of "motherese"", Journal of Child Language, 13(2), 431–437.
- Scarborough, H. S., Wyckoff, J., & Davidson, R. (1986). "A reconsideration of the relation between age and mean utterance length", Journal of Speech & Hearing Research, 29(3), 394–399.
- Scarborough, H. S. (1988). "Predicting the future achievement of second graders with reading disabilities: contributions of phonemic awareness, verbal memory, rapid naming, and IQ", Annals of Dyslexia, 48, 115–136.
- Scarborough, H. S. (1989). "Prediction of reading disability from familial and individual differences", Journal of Educational Psychology, 81(1), 101–108.
- Scarborough, H. S. (1990). "Very early language deficits in dyslexic children", Child Development, 61(6), 1728–1743.
- Scarborough, H. S. (1990). "Index of Productive Syntax", Applied Psycholinguistics, 11(1), 1–22.
- Scarborough, H. S., & Dobrich, W. (1990). "Development of children with early language delay", Journal of Speech & Hearing Research, 33(1), 70–83.
- Scarborough, H. S. (1991). "Very early language deficits in dyslexic children", Annual Progress in Child Psychiatry & Child Development, 204–227.
- Scarborough, H. S. (1991). "Antecedents to reading disability: Preschool language development and literacy experiences of children from dyslexic families", Reading and Writing, 3(3-4), 219–233.
- Scarborough, H. S. (1991). "Early syntactic development of dyslexic children", Annals of Dyslexia, 41, 207–220.
- Scarborough, H. S., Dobrich, W., & Hager, M. (1991). "Preschool literacy experience and later reading achievement", Journal of Learning Disabilities, 24(8), 508–511.
- Scarborough, H. S., Rescorla, L., Tager-Flusberg, H., & Fowler, A. E. (1991). "The relation of utterance length to grammatical complexity in normal and language-disordered group", Applied Psycholinguistics, 12(1), 23–45.
- Scarborough, H. S., & Fichtelberg, A. (1993). "Child-directed talk in families with incidence of dyslexia", First Language, 13, 51–67.
- Scarborough, H. S., & Dobrich, W. (1994). "Another look at parent-preschooler bookreading: How naked is the emperor? A response to Lonigan (1994) and Dunning, Mason, and Stewart (1994)", Developmental Review, 14(3), 340–347.
- Scarborough, H. S., & Dobrich, W. (1994). "On the efficacy of reading to preschoolers", Developmental Review, 14(3), 245–302.
- Scarborough, H. S. (1998). "Predicting the future achievement of second graders with reading disabilities: contributions of phonemic awareness, verbal memory, rapid naming, and IQ", Annals of dyslexia, 48, 115–136.
- Scarborough, H. S. (1998). "Early identification of children at risk for reading disabilities" in B. K. Shapiro, P. J. Accardo & A. J. Capute (eds.), Specific reading disability: A view of the spectrum (pp. 75–119). Timonium, MD: York Press.
- Scarborough, H. S., Ehri, L. C., Olson, R. K., & Fowler, A. E. (1998). "The fate of phonemic awareness beyond the elementary school years", Scientific Studies of Reading, 2(2), 115–142.
- Scarborough, H. S. (2002). "Connecting early language and literacy to later reading (dis)abilities: Evidence, theory and practice" in S. B. Neuman & D. K. Dickinson (eds.), Handbook of early literacy research (pp. 97–110). New York: Guilford Press.
- Scarborough, H. S., & Brady, S. A. (2002). "Toward a Common Terminology for Talking About Speech and Reading: A Glossary of the "Phon" Words and Some Related Terms", Journal of Literacy Research, 34(3), 299–336.
- Scarborough, H. S., & Parker, J. D. (2003). "Matthew Effects in Children with Learning Disabilities: Development of Reading, IQ, and Psychosocial Problems From Grade 2 to Grade 8", Annals of Dyslexia, 5(1), 47–72.
- Scarborough, H. S. (2005). "Developmental relationships between language and reading: Reconciling a beautiful hypothesis with some ugly facts", in H. W. Catts & A. G. Kamhi (eds.), The connections between language and reading disabilities (pp. 3–24). Mahwah, NJ: Lawrence Erlbaum.
- Snow, C. E., Scarborough, H. S., & Burns, M. (1999). "What speech-language pathologists need to know about early reading", Topics in Language Disorders, 20(1), 48–58.
- Patton Terry, N., & Scarborough, H. S. (2011). "The phonological hypothesis as a valuable framework for studying the relation of dialect variation to early reading skill" in S. Brady, D. Braze & C. A. Fowler (eds.), Explaining individual differences in reading: Theory and evidence. New York: Psychology Press.
