= Donald Shankweiler =

American psychologist and academic (1934–2026)

Donald Paul Shankweiler (September 13, 1934 – August 24, 2026) was an American psychologist and cognitive scientist, who conducted pioneering work on the representation and processing of language in the brain. He was a Professor Emeritus of Psychology at the University of Connecticut, a Senior Scientist at Haskins Laboratories in New Haven, Connecticut, and a member of the Board of Directors at Haskins. Shankweiler was married to well-known American philosopher of biology, psychology and language Ruth Millikan.

== Career ==
Shankweiler's research career spanned a number of areas related speech perception, reading and cognitive neuroscience. His main interests were studying the acquisition of reading and writing, understanding disorders of reading, writing, and spoken language, and exploring the representation of spoken and written language in the brain. In the 1960s, Shankweiler and Michael Studdert-Kennedy used a dichotic listening technique (presenting different nonsense syllables simultaneously to opposite ears) to demonstrate the dissociation of phonetic (speech) and auditory (nonspeech) perception by finding that phonetic structure devoid of meaning is an integral part of language, typically processed in the left cerebral hemisphere. Alvin Liberman, Franklin S. Cooper, Shankweiler, and Studdert-Kennedy summarized and interpreted 15 years of research in a paper "Perception of the Speech Code," that argued for the motor theory of speech perception. This is still among the most cited papers in the speech literature. It set the agenda for many years of research at Haskins and elsewhere by describing speech as a code in which speakers overlap (or coarticulate) segments to form syllables.

== Later work ==
Shankweiler's later work, done in conjunction with David Braze and other colleagues at Haskins Laboratories, identified sources of reading-related comprehension difficulties that are most subject to individual differences, and studies their cognitive and neurobiological underpinnings. This novel project brought together the knowledge base on reading differences and advanced psycholinguistic methods for studying on-line sentence processing, including tracking eye movements during reading and tracking brain activity (using fMRI) during coordinated reading and listening tasks.

== Death ==
Shankweiler died in Willimantic, Connecticut, on August 24, 2026, at the age of 91.

== Representative publications ==
- Shankweiler, D. P., & Harris, K. S. (1966). An experimental approach to the problem of articulation in aphasia. Cortex, 2, 277–292.
- Shankweiler, D., & Studdert-Kennedy, M. (1967). Identification of consonants and vowels presented to the left and right ears. Quarterly Journal of Experimental Psychology, 19, 59–63.
- A. M. Liberman, F. S. Cooper, D. S. Shankweiler, and M. Studdert-Kennedy. Perception of the speech code. (1967). Psychological Review, 74, 1967, 431–461.
- Studdert-Kennedy, M., & Shankweiler, D. P. (1970). Hemispheric specialization for speech perception. Journal of the Acoustical Society of America, 48, 579–594.
- Studdert-Kennedy, M., Shankweiler, D., & Schulman, S. (1970). Opposed effects of a delayed channel on perception of dichotically and monotically presented CV syllables. Journal of the Acoustical Society of America, 48, 599–602.
- Shankweiler, D. & Liberman, I.Y. (1972). Misreading: A search for causes. In Kavanagh, James F. & Mattingly, Ignatius G.(eds.) Language by ear and by eye; the relationships between speech and reading. (pp. 293–317). Cambridge, Mass., MIT Press.
- Studdert-Kennedy, M., Shankweiler, D., & Pisoni, D. (1972). Auditory and phonetic processes in speech perception: Evidence from a dichotic study. Journal of Cognitive Psychology, 2, 455–466.
- Shankweiler, D., & Studdert-Kennedy, M. (1975). A continuum of lateralization for speech perception? Brain and Language, 2, 212-225
- Shankweiler, D., & Crain, S. (1986) Language mechanisms and reading disorder: A modular approach. Cognition, 24, 139–168.
- Lukatela, K., Shankweiler, D., & Crain, S. (1995). Syntactic processing in agrammatic aphasia by speakers of a Slavic language. Brain and Language, 19, 50–76.
- Shankweiler, D., Crain, S., Katz, L., Fowler, A., Liberman, A. M., Brady, S., Thornton, R., Lundquist, E., Dreyer, L., Fletcher, J. Steubing, K., Shaywitz, S. E., & Shaywitz, B. (1995). Cognitive profiles of reading-disabled children: Comparison of language skills in phonology, morphology, and syntax. Psychological Science, 6, 149–156.
- Shankweiler, D., Lundquist, E., Katz, L., Steubing, K., Fletcher, J., Brady, S., Fowler, A., Dreyer, L., Marchione, K., Shaywitz, S., & Shaywitz, B. (1999). Comprehension and decoding: Patterns of association in children with reading difficulties. Scientific Studies of Reading, 3, 95–112.
- Shankweiler, D. (1999). Words to meanings. Scientific Studies of Reading, 3, 113–127.
- Ni, W., Constable, R. T., Mencl, W. E., Pugh, K., Fulbright, R., Shaywitz, S., Shaywitz, B., Gore, J. & Shankweiler, D. (2000). An event-related neuroimaging study distinguishing form and content in sentence processing. Journal of Cognitive Neuroscience, 12, 120–133.
- Pugh, K., Mencl, E.W., Shaywitz, B. A., Shaywitz, S. E., Fulbright, R. K., Skudlarski, P., Constable, R. T., Marchione, K., Jenner A. R., Shankweiler, D. P., Katz, L., Fletcher, J., Lacadie, C., & Gore, J. C. (2000). The angular gyrus in developmental dyslexia: Task-specific differences in functional connectivity in posterior cortex, Psychological Science, 11, 51–56.
- Crain, S., Ni, W., & Shankweiler, D. (2001). Grammatism. Brain and Language, 77, 294–304.
- Braze, D., Shankweiler, D.P., Ni, W., & Palumbo, L.C. (2002). Reader's eye movements distinguish anomalies of form and content. Journal of Psycholinguistic Research, 31, 25–44.
- Constable, R.T., Pugh, K. R., Berroya, E., Mancl, W. E., Westerveld, M., Ni, W., & Shankweiler, D. (2004). Sentence complexity and input modality effects in sentence comprehension: An fMRI study. NeuroImage, 22, 11–21.
- Shankweiler, D., Palumbo, L. C., Ni, W., Mencl, W. E., Fulbright, R., Pugh, K. R., Constable, R. T., Harris, K.S., Kollia, B., & Van Dyke, J. (2004). Unexpected recovery of language function after massive left-hemisphere infarct: Coordinated psycholinguistic and neuroimaging studies. Brain and Language, 91, 181–182.
- Shankweiler, D. & Fowler, A. E. (2004). Questions people ask about the role of phonological processes in learning to read. Reading and Writing: An Interdisciplinary Journal, 17, 483–515.
- Fletcher-Flinn, C. M.., Shankweiler, D., & Frost, S. J. (2004). Coordination of reading and spelling in early literacy: An examination of the discrepancy hypothesis. Reading and Writing: An Interdisciplinary Journal, 17, 617–644.
- Byrne, B., Shankweiler, D., & Hine, D.W. (in press). Reading development of children at risk for dyslexia. To appear in M. Mody & K. Silliman (Eds.), Language impairment and reading disability: Interactions among brain, behavior, and experience. New York: Guilford.
- LeVasseur, V., Macaruso, P., Palumbo, L., & Shankweiler, D. (2006). Syntactically cued text facilitates oral reading fluency in developing readers. Applied Psycholinguistics, 27, 423–445.
- Braze, D., Tabor, W., Shankweiler, D. P., & Mencl, W. E. (2007). Speaking up for Vocabulary: Reading Skill Differences in Young Adults. Journal of Learning Disabilities, 40, 226–243.
- Shankweiler, D. P., Mencl, W. E., Braze, D., Tabor, W., Pugh, K. R., & Fulbright, R. K. (2008). Reading differences and brain: Cortical integration of speech and print in sentence processing varies with reader skill. "Developmental Neuropsychology", 33, 745–776.
- Braze, D., Mencl, W. E., Tabor, W., Pugh, K. R., Constable, R. T., Fulbright, R. K., Magnuson, J. S., Van Dyke, J. A., & Shankweiler, D. P. (2011). Unification of sentence processing via ear and eye: An fMRI study. "Cortex", 47, 416–431.
- Magnuson, J. S., Kukona, A., Braze, D., Johns, C. L., Van Dyke, J. A., Tabor, W., Mencl, W. E., Pugh, K. R., & Shankweiler, D. P. (2011). Phonological instability in young adult poor readers: Time course measures and computational modeling. In P. McCardle, B. Miller, J. R. Lee & O. Tzeng (Eds.), "Dyslexia across languages: Orthography and the brain-gene-behavior link" (pp. 184–201). Baltimore, Maryland: Paul H. Brookes.
- Clark, N. B., McRoberts, G. W., Van Dyke, J. A., Shankweiler, D. P., & Braze, D. (2012). Immediate memory for new words and phonological awareness are associated in adults and pre-reading children. "Clinical Linguistics & Phonetics", 26, 577–596.
- Braze, D., Katz, L., Magnuson, J. S., Mencl, W. E., Tabor, W., Van Dyke, J. A., Gong, T., Johns, C. L., & Shankweiler, D. P. (2016). Vocabulary does not complicate the Simple View of Reading. Reading and Writing, 29(3), 435–451. doi:10.1007/s11145-015-9608-6
