= Geoffrey Studdert Kennedy =

Anglican priest and poet, known as "Woodbine Willie"

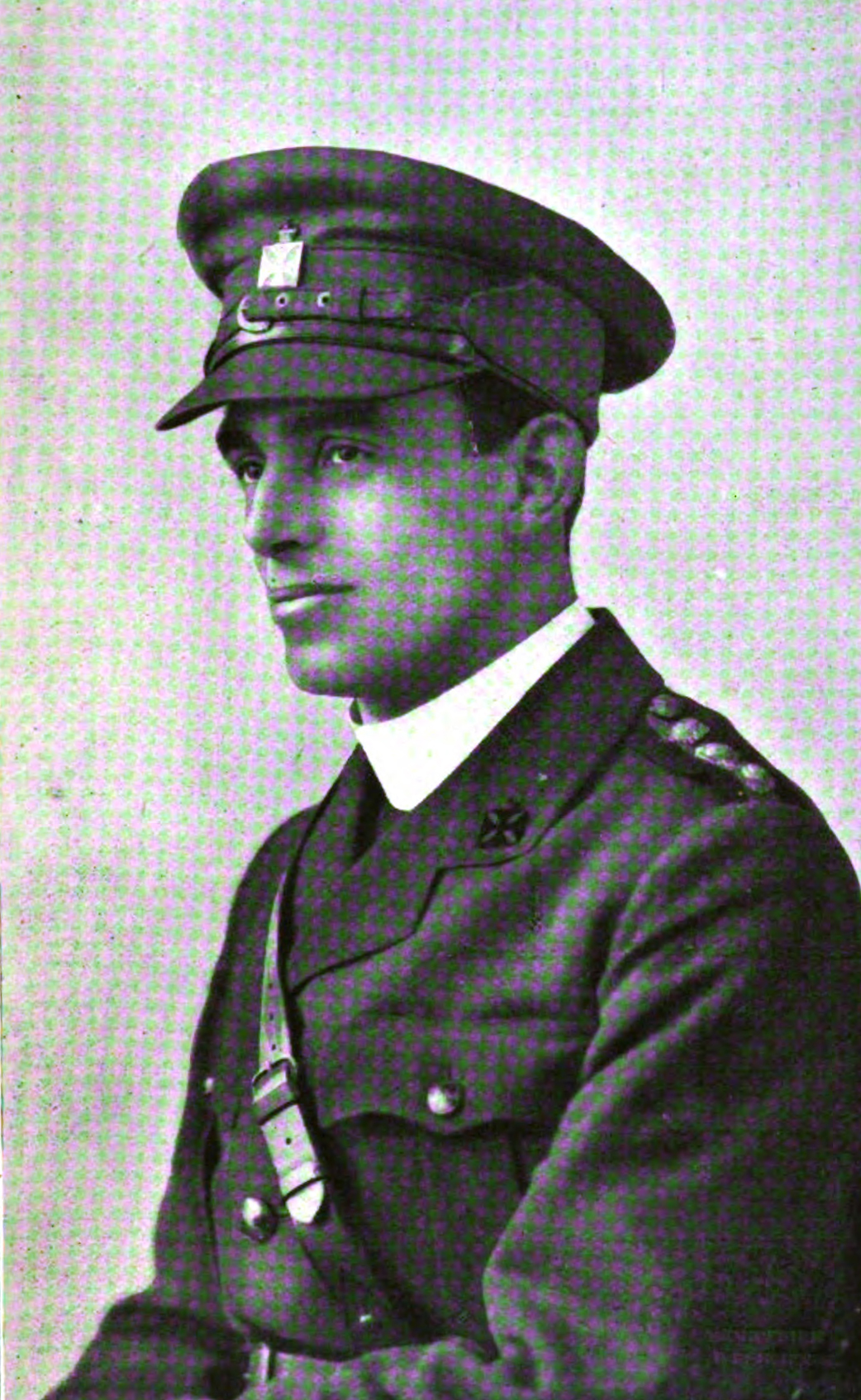
G. A. Studdert Kennedy, 1918

Geoffrey Anketell Studdert Kennedy MC (27 June 1883 – 8 March 1929) was an English Anglican priest and poet. He was nicknamed "Woodbine Willie" during World War I for giving Woodbine cigarettes to the soldiers he met, as well as spiritual aid to injured and dying soldiers.

== Early life ==
Born in Leeds, England, on 27 June 1883, Studdert Kennedy was the seventh of nine children born to Jeanette Anketell and William Studdert Kennedy, vicar of St Mary's, Quarry Hill in Leeds. His father William Studdert Kennedy was born in Blackrock, County Dublin, Ireland, in 1826. Geoffrey's paternal grandfather, Robert Mitchell Kennedy, was Dean of Clonfert in County Galway, Ireland from 1850 until his death in 1864. One of Geoffrey's brothers was Hugh A. Studdert Kennedy, a biographer of American religious leader Mary Baker Eddy.

Because of his Irish forefathers, Geoffrey always maintained he was an Irishman. He was educated at Leeds Grammar School and Trinity College, Dublin, where he gained a degree in classics and divinity in 1904. After a year's training at Ripon Clergy College, he became a curate at St Andrew's Church, Rugby, and then, in 1914, the vicar of St. Paul's, Worcester.

== Military career ==
On the outbreak of World War I, Studdert Kennedy volunteered as a chaplain to the army on the Western Front, where he gained the nickname "Woodbine Willie". In 1917, he was awarded the Military Cross at Messines Ridge after running into no man's land to help the wounded during an attack on the German frontline.

During the war he supported the British military effort with enthusiasm. Attached to a bayonet-training service, chaplain Kennedy toured with boxers and wrestlers to give morale-boosting speeches about the usefulness of the bayonet. One of his inspirational speeches is vividly described by A. S. Bullock as "the most extraordinary talk I ever heard'. Bullock notes that the listeners 'were a very rough, tough lot, but they sat spellbound", and quotes a section of the speech, at the end of which "everybody sprang to their feet and cheered him to the echo".

He wrote a number of poems about his experiences, and these appeared in the books Rough Rhymes of a Padre (1918), and More Rough Rhymes (1919), among others.

An anthology of his works was published under the title The Unutterable Beauty.

== Later life ==
After the war, Studdert Kennedy was given charge of St Edmund, King and Martyr in Lombard Street, London. Having been converted to Christian socialism and pacifism during the war, he wrote Lies (1919), Democracy and the Dog-Collar (1921) (featuring such chapters as "The Church Is Not a Movement but a Mob", "Capitalism is Nothing But Greed, Grab, and Profit-Mongering" and "So-Called Religious Education Worse than Useless"), Food for the Fed Up (1921), The Wicket Gate (1923), and The Word and the Work (1925). He moved to work for the Industrial Christian Fellowship, for whom he went on speaking tours of Britain.

His appointment as missioner for ICF released him from routine clerical duties to become an outspoken advocate for the working classes. One of his celebrated quotes was: "If finding God in our churches leads to us losing Him in our factories, then better we tear down those churches for God must hate the sight of them."

It was on one of these tours that he was taken ill with the flu, which was complicated by his weak lungs. He died in Liverpool on 8 March 1929, exhausted at the age of 45. The Dean of Westminster refused burial at Westminster Abbey, because he said Studdert Kennedy was a "socialist", even though he had distrusted most politicians and had refused to join any political party. His funeral took place in Worcester, to which First World War veterans and poor working people flocked to pay their respects.

== Honours and legacy ==
=== Honours ===
Studdert Kennedy was awarded the Military Cross (MC) during World War I. His citation read:

For conspicuous gallantry and devotion to duty. He showed the greatest courage and disregard for his own safety in attending to the wounded under heavy fire. He searched shell holes for our own and enemy wounded, assisting them to the dressing station, and his cheerfulness and endurance had a splendid effect upon all ranks in the front line trenches, which he constantly visited.

The Museum of Army Chaplaincy at Amport House, Hampshire, also honours Kennedy with a large display about his life. In February 2013, John Packer, Bishop of Ripon and Leeds unveiled a commemorative plaque in Ripon, North Yorkshire, to honour the Ripon Clergy College and Studdert Kennedy.

Studdert Kennedy is commemorated with a feast day (Commemoration) on the liturgical calendar of the Church of England on 8 March.

=== Legacy ===
He wrote the poem Roses in December, which J.M. Barrie quoted in his rectorial address to the University of St. Andrews entitled Courage in 1922, and often misattributed to Barrie.

War! Lies! And a Packet of Fags! is a play by David Gooderson about the Great War and its aftermath—the story of "Woodbine Willie".

He is mentioned in Finnegans Wake (1939) by Irish novelist James Joyce: "tsingirillies' zyngarettes, while Woodbine Willie, so popiular with the poppyrossies" (p. 351).

The Irish band Divine Comedy mentions him in its 2004 song "Absent Friends": "Woodbine Willie couldn't rest until he'd/given every bloke a final smoke/before the killing."

Venerable Archbishop Fulton J. Sheen quoted Studdert Kennedy's 1918 poem "Indifference" (from the collection called "Rough Rhymes of a Padre") when Sheen spoke publicly about the need for enthusiasm in all of one's life. Studdert Kennedy "wrote this poem during what was called ‘the great disillusion’ of the 1920s". Sheen's point was that the "world is suffering from indifference" as "apathy, not caring." Sheen noted that he wondered if Jesus Christ "did not suffer more from our indifference than he did from the crucifixion." To make his point he recited Studdert Kennedy's poem "Indifference."

His son was the psychologist and linguist Michael Studdert-Kennedy.

== Works ==
Poetry

- 1918: Rough Rhymes of a Padre: by "Woodbine Willie". London: Hodder and Stoughton
- 1919: More Rough Rhymes of a Padre. London: Hodder and Stoughton
- 1920: Peace Rhymes of a Padre. London: Hodder and Stoughton
- 1922: Songs of Faith and Doubt. London: Hodder and Stoughton
- 1924: The Sorrows of God and Other Poems (anthology) R.R. Smith, New York
- 1925: Lighten Our Darkness: Some Less Rough Rhymes of a Padre
- 1927: The Unutterable Beauty: the collected poetry of G. A. Studdert Kennedy (anthology). London: Hodder and Stoughton
- 1928: I Believe: Sermons on the Apostle's Creed First published as Food for the Fed-up (London: Hodder and Stoughton, 1921).
- 1929: Rhymes. [A selection from "Rough Rhymes. "More Rough Rhymes" and "Peace Rhymes."] (anthology). London: Hodder and Stoughtonn

Books

- 1918: Rough Talks by a Padre delivered to officers and men of the B.E.F. London: Hodder and Stoughton
- 1918: The Hardest Part. London: Hodder and Stoughton
- 1918: God and the Sacrament: a reprint of a chapter of the author's book entitled The Hardest Part. London: Hodder and Stoughton
- 1919: Why Aren't All the Best Chaps Christians? London: Hodder and Stoughton
- 1919: Lies. London: Hodder and Stoughton
- 1921: Democracy and the Dog Collar. London: Hodder and Stoughton
- 1921: Food for the Fed Up (US I Believe; sermons on the Apostles' creed). London: Hodder and Stoughton
- 1923: The Wicket Gate: or plain bread. London: Hodder and Stoughton
- 1926: The Word and the Work. London: Longmans
- 1927 I Pronounce Them: a story of man and wife – a novel. New York: George H Doran
- 1928: The Warrior the Woman and the Christ: a study of the leadership of Christ. London: Wyman and Sons
- 1928: Environment. E. Benn (32 pages)
- 1932: The New Man in Christ. London: Hodder and Stoughton
- 1932: When We Pray: a method of prayer taught by G.A. Studdert Kennedy . Hodder and Stoughton. Written by Ronald Sinclair
- 193?: Meaning of the Real Presence. (5 pages reprinted from) The Witness, NY

Anthologies

- 1947: The best of G.A. Studdert-Kennedy (Woodbine Willy) : selected from his writings by a friend. Hodder and Stoughton
- 2008: After War, Is Faith Possible? By Geoffrey Studdert Kennedy & Kerry Walters (editor). Lutterworth Press
