= Ioan Biris =

Romanian philosopher

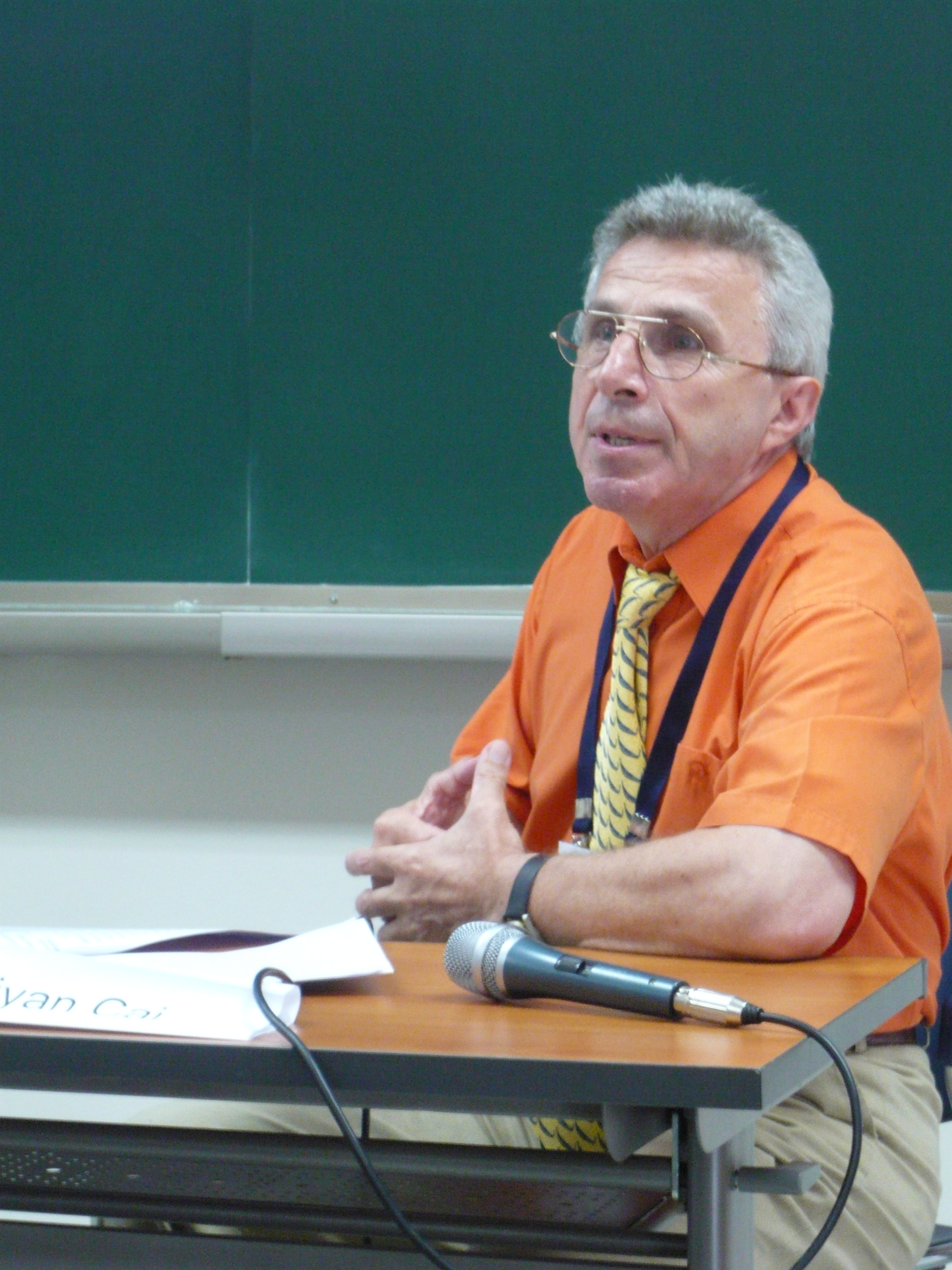
World Congress of Philosophy – Seoul 2008

Ioan Biris is a university professor at the West University of Timișoara,Department of Philosophy and Communication Sciences, Romania. He studied philosophy (B.Sc., 1976) at the Babes-Bolyai University from Cluj-Napoca. Secondary studies in sociology. Ph.D. in philosophy (1989) and Ph.D. in sociology (2000). He is known for his research in the areas of philosophy of science, analytic philosophy, ontology and applied logic.

== Publications ==
=== Books (in romanian) ===
Totality, sistem, holon (1992); History and culture (1996); Values of Law and intentional Logik (1996); Sociology of civilisations (2000); Society and cultural communication (ed., 2006); Totality, sistem, holon (second edition, 2007); Concepts of social sciences. Models and applications (2008); Role of imaginary in scientific knowledge (ed., 2009); Concepts of science (2010); Philosophy and logic of social sciences (2014).

=== Selected papers ===
- "L'identité symbolique et la logique partitive des valeurs spirituelles", in vol. XXIII World Congress of Philosophy, Athens, 2013.
- "The Moral Values and Partitive Logic", in vol. Valentin Mureşan and Shunzo Majima (eds), Applied Ethics. Perspectives from Romania, Hokkaido University, 2013.
- "The history of thinkers or the history of ideas? Michael Dummett's model", in vol. International Workshop on the Historiography of Philosophy: Representations and Cultural Constructions 201, Elsevier, 2013.
- "On the logical Form of institutional Creation from John Searle's Perspective" in vol. Georgeta Raţă, Patricia-Luciana Runcan, Michele Marsonet (eds.), Applied Social Sciences: Philosophy and Theology, Cambridge Scholars Publishing, 2013.
- "Le statut ontologique de la citoyenneté. La perspective de John Searle", in vol. XXXIV-eme Congres de l’ASPLF, Bruxelles-Louvain la Neuve, 2012.
- "The Relation of Similarity and the Communication of Science", în Balkan Journal of Philosophy, vol. 4, No. 1, 2012.
- "Religious Violence and the Logic of Weak Thinking: between R. Girard and G. Vattimo", in Journal for the Study of Religions and Ideologies, vol. 11, 32, 2012.
- "Scientific Knowledge and Problem of Significance", in vol. Teodor Dima, Dan Sîmbotin (eds.) Knowledge and Action within the Knowledge Based Society, Institutul European, Iaşi, 2011.
- "La signification performative et l'holisme pratique", in vol. XXXIII-eme Congres de l’ASPLF, Venise, 2010.
- "The Formal Structure of Experience in Carnap’s Aufbau", in Balkan Journal of Philosophy, vol. 2, No 2, 2010.
- "On the logic of religious terms", in Journal for the Study of Religions and Ideologies, volume 8. nr 22, Spring 2009.
- "La specificite des concepts des sciences sociales", in vol. XXII World Congress of Philosophy, Seul, 2008.
- "Le rapport identite-difference et la conjonction collective. Aspects logiques" in vol. XXXI-eme Congres de l’ASPLF, Budapest, 2006.
- "Reflexion et défi des limites de la pensée logique-scientifiques", XXXe Congrès de l’ ASPLF, Nantes, France, 2004.
- "Prééminence de la nature ou prééminence de l’histoire? Galilée et Vico" în vol. Esprits modernes, Etudes sur les modèles de pansée alternatifs aux XVIe-XVIIe siècles, Editura Universităţii din București, 2003.
- "Totalité et integration ontologique" XXI st World Congress of Philosophy, Istanbul, 2003.
- "Formés de rationalité dans l′ integration culturelle", in Avenir de la raison, devenir des rationalites, XXIX-ème Congrès de l′A.S.P.L.F., Nice, France, 2002.
- "La fonctionnalite’ de l’idee de "champ"dans les sciences sociales", Twentieth World Congress of Philosophy, Boston, 1998.
- "L’Ecole de Munich et la theorie structuraliste de la science", în Analele Universităţii din Timişoara, Seria Filosofie, VII, 1995.
- "Zeitliche Simultaneitat und religiose Zeit bei Kant", în Revue Roumaine de Philosophie, nr.1-2, 1994.

== Translation ==
- Michael Dummett, Origins of analytical philosophy (in Romanian), Dacia Publishing, Cluj-Napoca, 2004.
