= Amblyaudia =

Amber red

Amblyaudia (amblyos- blunt; audia-hearing) is a term coined by Dr. Deborah Moncrieff to characterize a specific pattern of performance from dichotic listening tests. Dichotic listening tests are widely used to assess individuals for binaural integration, a type of auditory processing skill. During the tests, individuals are asked to identify different words presented simultaneously to the two ears. Normal listeners can identify the words fairly well and show a small difference between the two ears with one ear slightly dominant over the other. For the majority of listeners, this small difference is referred to as a "right-ear advantage" because their right ear performs slightly better than their left ear. But some normal individuals produce a "left-ear advantage" during dichotic tests and others perform at equal levels in the two ears. Amblyaudia is diagnosed when the scores from the two ears are significantly different with the individual's dominant ear score much higher than the score in the non-dominant ear Researchers interested in understanding the neurophysiological underpinnings of amblyaudia consider it to be a brain based hearing disorder that may be inherited or that may result from auditory deprivation during critical periods of brain development. Individuals with amblyaudia have normal hearing sensitivity (in other words they hear soft sounds) but have difficulty hearing in noisy environments like restaurants or classrooms. Even in quiet environments, individuals with amblyaudia may fail to understand what they are hearing, especially if the information is new or complicated. Amblyaudia can be conceptualized as the auditory analog of the better known central visual disorder amblyopia. The term “lazy ear” has been used to describe amblyaudia although it is currently not known whether it stems from deficits in the auditory periphery (middle ear or cochlea) or from other parts of the auditory system in the brain, or both. A characteristic of amblyaudia is suppression of activity in the non-dominant auditory pathway by activity in the dominant pathway which may be genetically determined and which could also be exacerbated by conditions throughout early development.

== Symptoms and signs ==
Children with amblyaudia experience difficulties in speech perception, particularly in noisy environments, sound localization, and binaural unmasking (using interaural cues to hear better in noise) despite having normal hearing sensitivity (as indexed through pure tone audiometry). These symptoms may lead to difficulty attending to auditory information causing many to speculate that language acquisition and academic achievement may be deleteriously affected in children with amblyaudia. A significant deficit in a child's ability to use and comprehend expressive language may be seen in children who lacked auditory stimulation throughout the critical periods of auditory system development. A child suffering from amblyaudia may have trouble in appropriate vocabulary comprehension and production and the use of past, present and future tenses. Amblyaudia has been diagnosed in many children with reported difficulties understanding and learning from listening and adjudicated adolescents are at a significantly high risk for amblyaudia (Moncrieff, et al., 2013, Seminars in Hearing).

== Risk factors ==
Families report the presence of amblyaudia in several individuals, suggesting that it may be genetic in nature. It is possible that abnormal auditory input during the first two years of life may increase a child's risk for amblyaudia, although the precise relationship between deprivation timing and development of amblyaudia is still unclear. Recurrent ear infections (otitis media) are the leading cause of temporary auditory deprivation in young children. During ear infection bouts, the quality of the signal that reaches the auditory regions of the brains of a subset of children with OM is degraded in both timing and magnitude. When this degradation is asymmetric (worse in one ear than the other) the binaural cues associated with sound localization can also be degraded. Aural atresia (a closed external auditory canal) also causes temporary auditory deprivation in young children. Hearing can be restored to children with ear infections and aural atresia through surgical intervention (although ear infections will also resolve spontaneously). Nevertheless, children with histories of auditory deprivation secondary to these diseases can experience amblyaudia for years after their hearing has been restored.

== Physiology ==
Amblyaudia is a deficit in binaural integration of environmental information entering the auditory system. It is a disorder related to brain organization and function rather than what is typically considered a “hearing loss” (damage to the cochlea). It may be genetic or developmentally acquired or both. When animals are temporarily deprived of hearing from an early age, profound changes occur in the brain. Specifically, cell sizes in brainstem nuclei are reduced, the configuration of brainstem dendrites are altered and neurons respond in different ways to sounds presented to both the deprived and non-deprived ears.

An electrophysiologic study demonstrated that children with amblyaudia (referred to then as a "left-ear deficit") were less able to process information from their non-dominant ears when competing information is arriving at their dominant ears. The N400-P800 complex showed a strong and highly correlated response from the dominant and non-dominant ears among normal children while the response from children with amblyaudia was uncorrelated and indicated an inability to separate information arriving at the non-dominant ear from the information arriving at the dominant ear. The same children also produced weaker fMRI responses from their non-dominant left ears when processing dichotic material in the scanner.

== Diagnosis ==
A clinical diagnosis of amblyaudia is made following dichotic listening testing as part of an auditory processing evaluation. Clinicians are advised to use newly developed dichotic listening tests that provide normative cut-off scores for the listener's dominant and non-dominant ears. These are the Randomized Dichotic Digits Test and the Dichotic Words Test. Older dichotic listening tests that provide normative information for the right and left ears can be used to supplement these two tests for support of the diagnosis. If performance across two or more dichotic listening tests is normal in the dominant ear and significantly below normal in the non-dominant ear, a diagnosis of amblyaudia can be made.

== Treatments ==
A number of computer-based auditory training programs exist for children with generalized Auditory Processing Disorders (APD). In the visual system, it has been proven that adults with amblyopia can improve their visual acuity with targeted brain training programs (perceptual learning). A focused perceptual training protocol for children with amblyaudia called Auditory Rehabilitation for Interaural Asymmetry (ARIA) was developed in 2001 which has been found to improve dichotic listening performance in the non-dominant ear and enhance general listening skills.

== See also ==
- Amblyopia
- Auditory processing disorder
- Binaural fusion
- Hearing
- Otitis media
- Aural atresia
