= Oskar Rescher =

German academic (1883–1972)

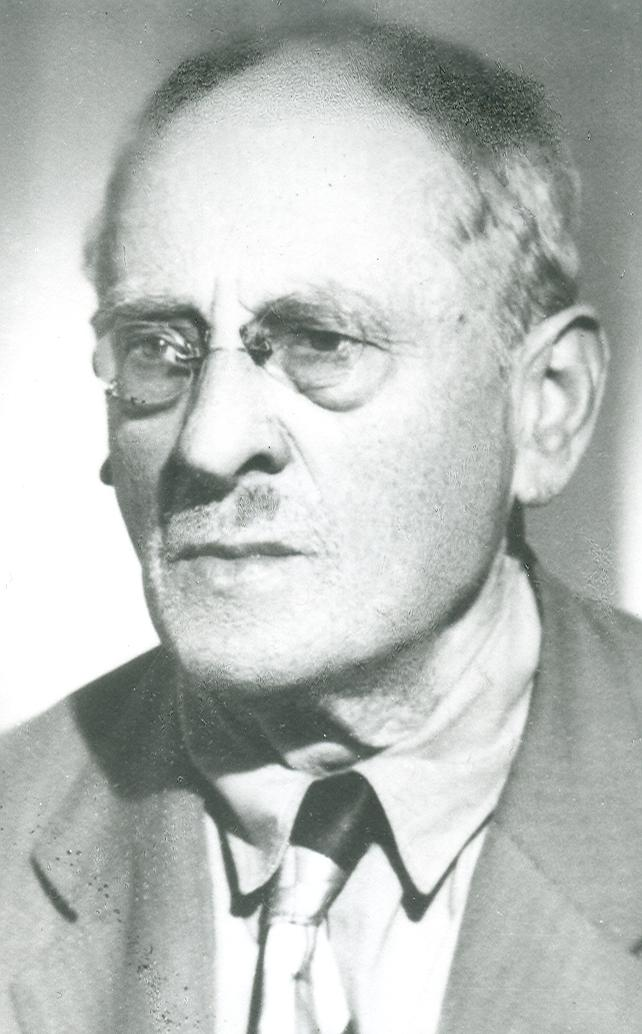
Oskar Rescher

Oskar Rescher (October 1, 1883 – March 26, 1972), also known as Osman Reşer, was a prolific German-Turkish scholar in Arabic, Persian, and Turkish literature who specialized in pre-Islamic Arabic poetry and Ottoman studies.

In 1903, Rescher began to study law in Munich, but soon changed to Oriental languages. After receiving his doctorate at Berlin in 1909 with a dissertation on the grammarian Ibn Jinni, he moved to Istanbul to work in the libraries there. During World War I, he served in the German Army as censor for Arabic prisoner of war correspondence. After the war, he moved to Breslau and received his Habilitation and venia legendi (the right to hold lectures at a German university) from the University of Breslau. In 1925 he began teaching as professor (without full chair) at Breslau, but in 1928 he took a long-term leave and returned to Turkey. He left Breslau "for reasons that can no longer be determined but he evidently did so with resentment". Rescher also relinquished his membership in the Deutsche Morgenländische Gesellschaft (DMG), the society of Oriental scholars in Germany. In due course he acculturated to the Turkish locale, changing the spelling of his name, and converting to Islam. For many years he was a staff member of the Islamic Institute of the University of Istanbul. There he spent the rest of his life, producing numerous scholarly studies and translating many texts into German, as well as writing Oriental-style poetry in German himself. Apart from keeping in close contact with his Turkish colleagues and with Hellmut Ritter, who was between 1926 and 1949 a semi-official representative of the DMG in Istanbul, Rescher lived a solitary life in his Istanbul house overlooking the Bosporus, accompanied by many cats.

In 1933, the German Nazi government revoked Rescher's venia legendi, and in 1937, he became a Turkish citizen. Most of his work appeared in small editions in Turkey, but gradually made its way into the mainstream of European Oriental scholarship. He devoted much effort over many years to build up a large collection of Arabic and Persian manuscripts. These now form the Rescher Manuscript Collection of the Berlin Staatsbibliothek, as well as a collection at the Beinecke Rare Book and Manuscript Library at Yale University. His extensive library of printed books in Arabic, Persian, and Turkish, as well as the secondary literature in European languages, has been bought by the Ruhr Universität in Bochum (Germany) and forms the nucleus of the library of its Seminar für Orientalistik und Islamwissenschaften. Oskar Rescher is related to Nicholas Rescher, a well-known German-American philosopher who is also a scholar of Arabic, and who has made various contributions to the study of Arabic logics.

Oskar Rescher's publications include some valuable indices for works of classical Arabic literature like al-Bukhari's hadith-collection and Yaqut's Mu'jam al-buldan. He produced an Abriss der arabischen Literaturgeschichte, 2 vols. (Konstantinopel-Pera: Abajoli, 1925 and 1933, Reprint Osnabrück: Biblio-Verlag, 1983), as well as an extensive series of Beiträge zur arabischen Poesie, 8 vols. (Stuttgart and Istanbul, 1935–1963). Some of his publications are reprinted in: Gesammelte Werke: eine Sammlung der wichtigsten Schriften Oskar Reschers teilweise mit Ergänzungen und Verbesserungen aus dem schriftlichen Nachlass, 5 fasc. (Osnabrück: Biblio-Verlag, 1978–95).
