= Vagrant predicate =

Vagrant predicates are logical constructions that exhibit an inherent limit to conceptual knowledge. Such predicates can be used in general descriptions but are self-contradictory when applied to particulars. For instance, there are numbers which have never been mentioned but no example can be given as this would contradict its definition. Vagrant predicates have been proposed and studied by Nicholas Rescher.

F is a vagrant predicate iff ($\exists$u)Fu is true while nevertheless Fu_{0} is false for each and every specifically identified u_{0}.

When infinity is thought of as a number greater than any given, a similar idea is conceived. However vagrancy needs not to be monotonous and occurs also within bounds. Rescher has used vagrant predicates to solve the vagueness problem.
