= Nicholas Rescher Prize for Systematic Philosophy =

Biennial prize in philosophy

The Nicholas Rescher Prize for Systematic Philosophy was established by the University of Pittsburgh in 2009 to counter present-day tendencies to narrow specialization by rewarding and showcasing the work of philosophers who have addressed the historical “big questions” of the field in ways that nevertheless command the respect of specialists. Awarded biennially the prize consists of a gold medal together with a sum of $25,000. The prize is named for Nicholas Rescher, Distinguished University Professor of Philosophy, who served on the university’s faculty for over 50 years.

== Recipients ==
Date	Name(s)	Reference(s)
2010	Ernest Sosa	
2012	Alvin Plantinga and Jürgen Mittelstraß (joint award)	
2015	Hilary Putnam	
2017	Ruth Millikan	
2019	Philip Kitcher	
2021	Thomas Nagel	
2023	Christine M. Korsgaard	
2025	Bas van Fraassen	
2027	Nancy Cartwright	
