= Jürgen Mittelstraß =

German philosopher

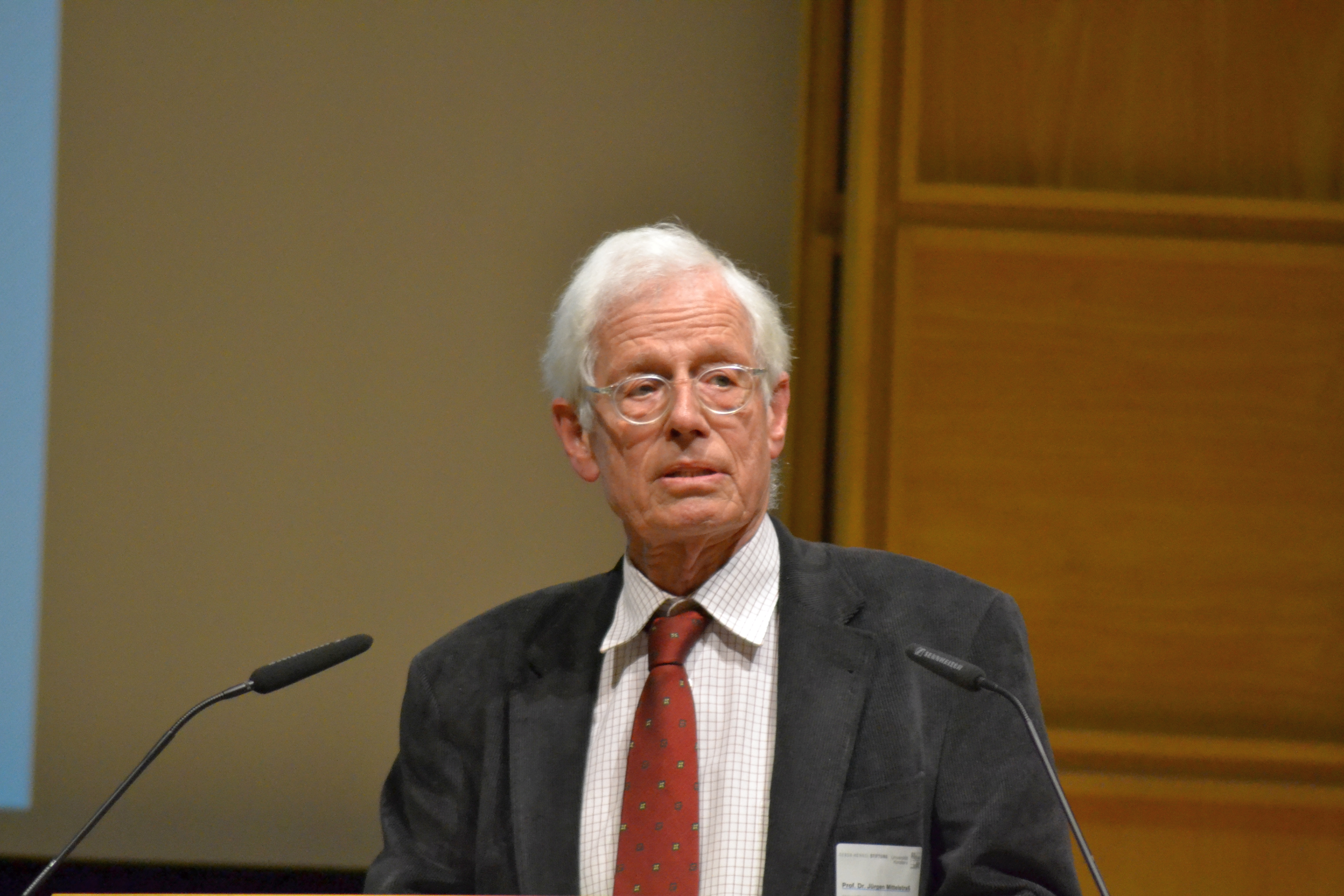
Jürgen Mittelstraß at a Conference in 2015.

Jürgen Mittelstraß (born 11 October 1936) is a German philosopher especially interested in the philosophy of science.

== Career ==
Mittelstraß studied philosophy, history and protestant theology at the universities of Bonn, Erlangen, Hamburg and Oxford from 1956 until 1961. He received his Ph.D. from the University of Erlangen in 1961, where he afterwards wrote his habilitation, completing in 1968. He was influenced by the Erlanger Konstruktivismus.

In 1970 Mittelstraß became a professor of philosophy in the University of Konstanz and from 1970 to 2005 he was a full professor of philosophy of science at Konstanz.

He was the lead editor of the Enzyklopädie Philosophie und Wissenschaftstheorie (4 volumes, 1980–1996; second edition 2005–2018, 8 volumes).

== Academic recognition ==
Mittelstraß is member of numerous scientific and philosophical societies and has received several awards. He has been awarded honorary doctorates from six universities, the Humboldt University of Berlin, Technische Universität Berlin, the Universities of Pittsburgh, Iaşi, Duisburg-Essen and the Tartu.

Between 2005 and 2015 Mittelstraß held the Chair of the former Austrian Science Council (integrated into the Austrian Council for Sciences, Technology, and Innovation since 2023).

Mittelstraß is a member of the Berlin-Brandenburg Academy of Sciences and Humanities, the Pontifical Academy of Sciences and the Academia Europaea (1988).

== Private life ==
Jürgen Mittelstraß is married and has four daughters.

== Awards ==
- Gottfried Wilhelm Leibniz Prize (German Research Foundation, 1989)
- Order of Merit of the State of Berlin (1993)
- Merit Cross 1st Class of the Order of Merit of the Federal Republic of Germany (Verdienstkreuz 1. Klasse) (1999)
- Arthur Burkhardt Prize (1992)
- Lorenz Oken Medal (Society of German Scientists and Physicians, 1998)
- Award of the Dr. Margrit Egnér Foundation (2000)
- Werner Heisenberg Medal (Alexander von Humboldt Foundation, 2000)
- Bavarian Order of Merit (2006)
- Austrian Cross of Honour for Science and Art, 1st class (2011)
- Nicholas Rescher Prize for Systematic Philosophy (University of Pittsburgh, 2012)

== Major works ==
- Die Rettung der Phänomene (1962, Dissertation)
- Neuzeit und Aufklärung (1970, ISBN 3-11-001825-X)
- Die Möglichkeit von Wissenschaft (1974, ISBN 3-518-07662-0)
- Wissenschaft als Lebensform (1982, ISBN 3-518-27976-9
- Der Flug der Eule (1989, ISBN 3-518-28396-0)
- Die unzeitgemäße Universität (1994, ISBN 3-518-28759-1)
- Die Häuser des Wissens (1998, ISBN 3-518-28990-X)
- Wissen und Grenzen (2001, ISBN 3-518-29166-1)
- Wem gehört das Sterben?, in: Robertson-von Trotha, Caroline Y. (ed.): Tod und Sterben in der Gegenwartsgesellschaft. Eine interdisziplinäre Auseinandersetzung [= Kulturwissenschaft interdisziplinär/Interdisciplinary Studies on Culture and Society, Vol. 3] (2008, ISBN 978-3-8329-3171-1)
