= Ruth Millikan =

American philosopher

- Born: Ruth Garrett Millikan; 1933 (age 92–93); Philadelphia, Pennsylvania, U.S.

Education
- Education: Oberlin College; Yale University
- Doctoral advisor: Wilfrid Sellars

Philosophical work
- Era: Contemporary philosophy
- Region: Western philosophy
- School: Analytic
- Institutions: University of Connecticut
- Main interests: Philosophy of biology, philosophy of psychology, philosophy of language
- Notable ideas: Biosemantics

Ruth Garrett Millikan (/ˈmɪlɪkən/; born 1933) is an American philosopher of biology, psychology, and language. Millikan has spent most of her career at the University of Connecticut, where she is now professor emerita of Philosophy.

== Education and career ==
Millikan earned her BA from Oberlin College in 1955. At Yale University, she studied under Wilfrid Sellars. Although W. Sellars left for the University of Pittsburgh midway through Millikan's doctorate, she stayed at Yale and earned her PhD in 1969. She and Paul Churchland are often considered leading proponents of "right wing" (i.e., who emphasize Sellars's scientific realism) Sellarsianism.

Millikan taught half-time at Berea College from 1969 to 1972, Two-thirds time at Western Michigan University from 1972 to 1973, half-time at the University of Michigan from 1993 to 1996, but otherwise spent her entire career at the University of Connecticut, where she is now professor emerita. She is married to American psychologist and cognitive scientist Donald Shankweiler.

She was awarded the Jean Nicod Prize and gave the Jean Nicod Lectures in Paris in 2002. She was elected to the American Academy of Arts and Sciences in 2014. In 2017, she received both the Nicholas Rescher Prize for Systematic Philosophy from the University of Pittsburgh and the Rolf Schock Prize in Logic and Philosophy.

== Philosophical work ==
Millikan is most famous for the view which, in her 1989 paper of the same name, she refers to as "biosemantics". Biosemantics is a theory about something philosophers often refer to as "intentionality". Intentionality is the phenomenon of things being 'about' other things, paradigm cases being thoughts and sentences. A belief of mine that you will do my chores for me, for example, is about you and about my chores. The same is true of a corresponding desire, intention or spoken or written command.

In general, the goal of a theory of intentionality is to explain the phenomenon – things being 'about' other things – in other, more informative, terms. Such a theory aims to give an account of what this 'aboutness' consists in. Just as chemistry offers the claim "Water is H2O" as a theory of what water consists in, so biosemantics aims for a constitutive account of intentionality. Such an account, Millikan stresses, must deal adequately with such hallmarks of mentality as error, confusion, and what looks like standing in a relation (the 'aboutness' relation) to something that doesn't exist. For example: one 'sees' the stick is bent, but realizes otherwise after pulling it from the water; the inexperienced prospector thinks he's struck it rich, but he's holding a lump of pyrite ("fool's gold"); the field marshal thinks about the next day's battle, the child wants to ride a unicorn, and the phrase "the greatest prime" is somehow 'about' a number that cannot possibly exist (there's a simple proof for this).

As the name hints, Millikan's theory explains intentionality in terms that are broadly 'biological' or teleological. Specifically, she explains intentionality using the explanatory resources of natural selection: what thoughts and sentences and desires are 'about' is ultimately elucidated by reference to what has been selected and what it has been selected for (i.e., what advantage it conferred on ancestors who possessed it). Where this selection is non-intentional, then what it is for is its 'proper function'.

Equally important is what might be called the co-evolution of producer-mechanisms and consumer-mechanisms. Millikan refers to the intertwined selection histories of these mechanisms to explain the hallmarks of mentality and to offer a wide range of positions on various matters of dispute in the philosophy of mind and language.

In her article "Naturalist Reflections on Knowledge", Millikan defends the position that the justification of true beliefs through an explanation in accordance with evolution constitutes knowledge.

== Publications ==
=== Books ===
- (1984) Language, Thought and Other Biological Categories (ISBN 978-0262631150)
- (1993) White Queen Psychology and Other Essays for Alice (ISBN 978-0262631624)
- (2000) On Clear and Confused Ideas (ISBN 978-0521625531)
- (2004) Varieties of Meaning: The 2002 Jean Nicod Lectures (ISBN 978-0262633420)
- (2005) Language: A Biological Model (ISBN 978-0199284771)
- (2012) Biosemantik Sprachphilosophische Aufsätze, six essays with a foreword, translated by Alex Burri, Surkamp Verlag (ISBN 9783518295793)
- (2017) Beyond Concepts: Unicepts, Language, and Natural Information (ISBN 978-0198717195)

Note: the 1993, 2005 and 2012 books are collections of papers.

=== Other works ===
Millikan has also published many articles, many of which are listed and available here.

== See also ==
- American philosophy
- List of American philosophers
- List of Jean Nicod Prize laureates
- Social ontology
