= Susan Brady =

American psychologist

Susan Brady is an American psychologist and literacy expert who is a professor of school psychology at the University of Rhode Island. For many years, she led the Haskins Literacy Initiative at Haskins Laboratories in New Haven, Connecticut which promotes the "science of teaching reading." She has been a leading researcher in the area of reading acquisition for over thirty years and has been involved with efforts to improve state and national policy on the teaching of reading including speaking before a U.S. Senate committee. Her education includes a Ph.D and M.A. from the University of Connecticut, and a B.A. from Miami University.

== Selected publications ==
- Brady, S., Shankweiler, D., & Mann, V. (1983). Speech perception and memory coding in relation to reading ability. Journal of Experimental Child Psychology, 35, 345–367.
- Brady, S. (1986). Short-term Memory, Phonological Processing and Reading Ability. Annals of Dyslexia, Vol. 36, 138–153.
- Brady, S., Mann, V., & Schmidt, R. (1987). Errors in short-term memory for good and poor readers. Memory & Cognition, 15(5), 444–453.
- Brady, S.A. & Fowler, A.E. (1988). Phonological Precursors to reading acquisition. Malsand, R.A.. & Masland, M.W. (eds.) Preschool Prevention of Reading Failure. pp. 204–215. Parkton, MD, York Press.
- Brady, S., Poggie, E., & Rapala, M. M. (1990). Speech Repetition Abilities in Children Who Differ in Reading Skill. Language and Speech, 32(2), 109–122.
- Brady, S., Fowler, A., Stone, B., & Winbury, N. (1994). Training Phonological Awareness: A Study with Inner-City Kindergarten Children. Annals of Dyslexia, 44, 26–59.
- Brady, S.A. (1997). Ability to encode phonological representations: An underlying difficulty of poor readers. In B. Blackman (Ed.), Foundations of reading acquisition and dyslexia: Implications for early intervention. Lawrence Erlbaum Associates, Hillsdale, NJ. (pp. 2–28).
- Brady, S., & Dietrich, J. A. (2001). Phonological representations of adult poor readers: An investigation of specificity and stability. Applied Psycholinguistics, 22, 383–418.
- Scarborough, H.S. & Brady, S.A. (2002). Toward a common terminology for talking about speech and reading: a glossary of the "phon" words and some related terms. Journal of Literacy Research, V.34, No. 3, pp. 299–336.
- Shankweiler, D., Lundquist, E., Katz, L., Stuebing, K. K., Fletcher, J. M., Brady, S., Fowler, A., Dreyer, L. G., Marchione, K. E., Shaywitz, S. E., & Shaywitz, B. A. (1999). Comprehension and decoding: Patterns of association in children with reading difficulties. Scientific Studies of Reading, 3, 69–94.
- Brady, S., Braze, D., & Fowler, C. A. (Eds.). (2011). "Explaining individual differences in reading: Theory and evidence". New York: Psychology Press.
- Brady, S. (2011). Efficacy of phonics teaching for reading outcomes: Indications from post-NRP research. In S. A. Brady, D. Braze & C. A. Fowler (Eds.), "Explaining individual differences in reading: Theory and evidence". New York: Psychology Press.
