= Ram Frost =

Professor of psychology (born 1954)

Ram Frost (Hebrew: רם פרוסט; born October 15, 1954) is a Professor of Psychology at the Hebrew University of Jerusalem, with affiliations to Haskins Laboratories in New Haven, US, and The Basque Center for Cognition Brain and Language (BCBL) in San Sebastian, Spain. He has published extensively on cross-linguistic differences in reading. His research on reading in Hebrew has challenged anglocentric theoretical perspectives and led to his appointment to the National Committee for Teaching Reading (The Shapira Committee), whose report (December 2001) influenced Israel’s educational system and methods for teaching reading. Between 1999 and 2005, Frost served as a member of the Council for Higher Education Committee (MALAG) for Students with Learning Disabilities. In parallel with his research on reading, Ram frost has made major contributions to understanding statistical learning and its relation to cognitive abilities.

Ram Frost has written and published two novels in Hebrew: "Footprints in the sand", Keter, 2009; "The artwork", Kinneret, Zmora, Dvir, 2022. He lives in Tel Aviv and in the South of France.

== Education ==
Ram Frost received his Ph.D. in Cognitive Psychology in 1986, at the Hebrew University of Jerusalem. He was a post-doctoral fellow at Haskins Laboratories 1986–1988, and a Fulbright fellow 1993–1994. He was a visiting professor at the University of Arizona,1993-1994, University Aix-Marseille, 1998-1999; Lyon II University, 2005-2006; The BCBL, 2013-2014; National Taiwan Normal University, 2019.

== Scientific contributions ==
Frost's main contributions have been in the area of reading, visual word recognition, and statistical learning. He is mostly known for his landmark theoretical papers that had substantial impact on the field, offering novel and counter-intuitive perspectives. His Orthographic Depth Hypothesis has argued, contrary to the then mainstream position, that spelling-to-sound correspondence leads to significant differences in reading strategies. His Strong Phonological Theory of Visual Word Recognition has argued that the fast recognition of letter-sounds drives reading in any writing system. His pivotal experimental work on morphological processing in Hebrew using fast presentation techniques has shown that the root structure of Semitic languages impact basic visual processing of letters. His research on letter-position coding in Hebrew has led to his recent comprehensive theoretical paper “Towards a Universal Theory of Reading”, arguing that writing systems evolve non-arbitrarily to reflect the language phonological and morphological structure. Therefore, contrary to common assumptions and intuitions, linguistic factors must be taken into account to understand even peripheral visual processing of print. Prof. Frost was Associate Editor of the journal Language and Cognitive Processes (1996–1999) and in 1999 he founded the International Morphological Processing Conference (MORPROC). In recent years Frost has argued for a novel theoretical perspective tying individual sensitivity to regularities in the environment (statistical learning), to assimilating the structural properties of a novel writing system. His work on statistical learning outlined to what extent sensitivity to regularities is domain general or domain specific. In 2016, Frost was awarded the ERC (European Research Council) Advanced research grant to lead a multinational investigation on what predicts ease or difficulty in learning to read in a second language. He served as member of the SH4 ERC Panel from 2012-2019.
