= Ken Pugh =

Kenneth R. Pugh (born c. 1957) is president, director of research, and a senior scientist at Haskins Laboratories in New Haven, Connecticut and professor in the Department of Psychology at University of Connecticut. He is also an associate professor in the Department of Linguistics at Yale University, an associate professor in the Department of Diagnostic Radiology at the Yale School of Medicine, and director of the Yale Reading Center. Pugh is a cognitive neuroscientist and experimental psychologist who is best known for his work on the neural, behavioral and cognitive underpinnings of reading and other cognitive activities.

== Education ==
Pugh received his B.S. in psychology, summa cum laude, from the New York Institute of Technology in 1982. He received his M.A. in 1987 and his Ph.D. in 1990, both in Experimental Psychology from Ohio State University.

== Scientific contributions ==
Pugh's primary contributions have been in the areas of cognitive neuroscience and psycholinguistics. He was among the first scientists to use functional magnetic resonance imaging (fMRI) to reveal brain activity associated with reading and reading disabilities. His current research employs combined behavioral and neurobiological measures and genetic information in the study of typical and atypical reading and language development, with a particular focus on learning and plasticity in disabled readers, including those with dyslexia. Pugh is a member of the National Academies/National Research Council Committee on Learning Sciences: Foundations and Applications to Adolescent and Adult Literacy.

His most recent book, which he edited with Peggy McCardle of the National Institutes of Health, How Children Learn to Read: Current Issues and New Directions in the Integration of Cognition, Neurobiology and Genetics of Reading and Dyslexia Research and Practice, provides a survey of contemporary research and thinking in these areas.

== Selected publications ==
- Pugh, K., Rexer, K., Peter, M., & Katz, L. (1994). Neighborhood effects in visual word recognition: Effects of letter delay and nonword context difficulty. Journal of Experimental Psychology: Learning, Memory, and Cognition, 20, 639–648.
- Shaywitz, B., Shaywitz, S., Pugh, K., Constable, T., Skudlarski, P., Fulbright, R., Bronen, R., Fletcher, J., Shankweiler, D., Katz, L., & Gore, J. (1995). Sex differences in the functional organization of the brain for language. Nature, 373, 607–609.
- Pugh, K., Shaywitz, B., Constable, T., Shaywitz, S., Skudlarski, P., Fulbright, R., Bronen, R., Shankweiler, D., Katz, L., Fletcher, J., & Gore, J. (1996). Cerebral organization of component processes in reading. Brain, 119, 1221–1238.
- Pugh, K. R., Sandak, R., Frost, S. J., Moore, D., & Mencl, W. E. (2005). Examining reading development and reading disability in English language learners: Potential contributions from functional neuroimaging. Learning Disabilities Research & Practice, 20 (1), 24–30.
- Pugh, Ken and McCardle, Peggy (eds.). (2009). How Children Learn to Read: Current Issues and New Directions in the Integration of Cognition, Neurobiology and Genetics of Reading and Dyslexia Research and Practice. Psychology Press.
- Diehl, J. J., Frost, S. J., Mencl, W. E., & Pugh, K. R. (2011). Neuroimaging and the phonological deficit hypothesis. In S. Brady, D. Braze & C. A. Fowler (Eds.), "Explaining individual differences in reading: Theory and evidence". New York: Psychology Press.
