= Edward Kennedy (priest) =

Irish priest

Edward Mitchell Kennedy was a Church of Ireland priest in Ireland during the nineteenth century.

Kennedy was educated at Trinity College, Dublin. He was Prebendary of Stagonil in St Patrick's Cathedral from 1843 to 1846; and then of Clonmethan from 1846. He was Dean of Clonfert from 1850 until his death in 1864.
