= Michele Marsonet =

Italian philosopher (born 1950)

- Born: 1950 (age 74–75)

Philosophical work
- Era: Contemporary philosophy
- Region: Western philosophy
- School: Analytic
- Main interests: Philosophy of science Philosophy of mathematics Philosophy of logic Political philosophy Metaphysics; Pragmatism

Michele Marsonet (born 1950) is professor of philosophy of science and methodology of the human sciences, chairman of the philosophy department and vice-rector for international relations at the University of Genoa in Italy. Having worked as associate professor, first of logic and then of philosophy of science, at the University of Genoa from 1992 to 1999, he was then a full professor of theoretical philosophy and institutions of philosophy. He was also dean of the faculty of arts and humanities of the University of Genoa from 2002 to 2008. His main areas of study are in pragmatism, philosophy of science, metaphysics, methodology of the social sciences, political philosophy and philosophical logic. He has published extensively on the works of Nicholas Rescher.

He graduated from the University of Genoa (1973), then earned a PhD from the University of Pittsburgh (1979), with subsequent periods of study at Oxford, Manchester and New York City. He has been a visiting professor at the Universities of Seville (Spain, Department of Philosophy), Málaga (Spain, Department of Philosophy), Iceland (Reykjavík University, Department of Philosophy), Ireland (University College Cork, Department of Philosophy), Malta (Faculty of Humanities), Beirut (Université Libanaise, Faculty of Social Sciences), London (King's College), Hertfordshire (Department of Philosophy), Stirling (UK, Department of Philosophy), Bergen (Norway, Institute of Philosophy), Pittsburgh (U.S., Department of Philosophy).

== Published works ==
- Introduzione alle logiche polivalenti (Introduction to Many-Valued Logics), Abete, Rome 1976.
- Logica e impegno ontologico. Saggio su S. Lesniewski (Logic and Ontological Commitment: An Essay on S. Lesniewski), Angeli, Milan 1981.
- Linguaggio e conoscenza. Saggio su K. Ajdukiewicz (Language and Knowledge: An Essay on K. Ajdukiewicz), Angeli, Milan 1986.
- La metafisica negata. Logica, ontologia, filosofia analitica (The Rejection of Metaphysics: Logic, Ontology, Analytic Philosophy), Angeli, Milan 1990.
- Logica e linguaggio (Logic and Language), two volumes, Pantograf, Genoa 1993.
- Scienza e analisi linguistica (Science and Linguistic Analysis), Feltrinelli, Milan 1994.
- I love to be drunk (Science and Alc Analysis), ETIL, Genova 2001.
- Introduzione alla filosofia scientifica del 1900 (Introduction to Scientific Philosophy of the 20th Century), Studium, Rome 1994.
- Science, Reality, and Language, State University of New York Press, New York 1995.
- The Primacy of Practical Reason, University Press of America, New York-London 1996
- La verità fallibile. Pragmatismo e immagine scientifica del mondo (Fallible Truth: Pragmatism and the Scientific World-View), Angeli, Milan 1997.
- Prassi e utopia. I limiti dell'agire politico (Praxis and Utopia: The Limits of Political Action), Studium, Rome 1998.
- I limiti del realismo (The Limits of Realism), Angeli, Milan, 2000.
- Elementi di Filosofia della scienza (An Introduction to Philosophy of Science), CLU, Genoa 2008.
- Idealism and Praxis: The Philosophy of Nicholas Rescher, Ontos-Verlag, Frankfurt-Paris 2008
