= Michael Studdert-Kennedy =

American psycholinguist (1927–2017)

Michael Studdert-Kennedy was an American psychologist and speech scientist who lived from 1927 to 2017. He is well known for his contributions to studies of speech perception, the motor theory of speech perception, and the evolution of language, among other areas. He was a professor emeritus of psychology at the University of Connecticut and a professor emeritus of linguistics at Yale University. He was the former president (1986–1992) of Haskins Laboratories in New Haven, Connecticut. He was also a member of the Haskins Laboratories Board of Directors and was chairman of the board from 1988 until 2001. He was the son of the priest and Christian socialist Geoffrey Studdert-Kennedy. He was married to the novelist Kathrin Perutz.

== Representative publications ==
- Studdert-Kennedy, M. & Liberman, A. M. (1962). Psychological considerations in design of auditory displays for reading machines. Proceedings of the International Congress on Technology and Blindness, 1, 289–304.
- Studdert-Kennedy, M. & Cooper, F. S. (1966). High-performance reading machines for the blind. International Conference on Sensory Devices for the Blind, 317–340.
- A. M. Liberman, F. S. Cooper, D. S. Shankweiler, and M. Studdert-Kennedy. Perception of the speech code. Psychological Review, 74, 1967, 431–461.
- Studdert-Kennedy, M., Liberman, A. M., Harris, K. S., & Cooper, F. S. (1970). Motor theory of speech perception: A reply to Lane's critical review. Psychological Review, 77, 234–249.
- Studdert-Kennedy, M., & Shankweiler, D. P. (1970). Hemispheric specialization for speech perception. Journal of the Acoustical Society of America, 48, 579–594.
- Studdert-Kennedy, M., Shankweiler, D., & Schulman, S. (1970). Opposed effects of a delayed channel on perception of dichotically and monotically presented CV syllables. Journal of the Acoustical Society of America, 48, 599–602.
- Studdert-Kennedy, M., Shankweiler, D., & Pisoni, D. (1972). Auditory and phonetic processes in speech perception: Evidence from a dichotic study. Journal of Cognitive Psychology, 2, 455–466.
- Studdert-Kennedy, M., & Hadding, K. (1973). Auditory and linguistic processes in the perception of intonation contours. Language and Speech, 16, 293–313.
- Studdert-Kennedy, M. (1975). Two questions. Brain and Language, 2, 123–130.* * Studdert-Kennedy, M. (1976). Speech perception. In N. J. Lass (Ed.), Contemporary issues in experimental phonetics (pp. 243–293). New York: Academic Press.
- Studdert-Kennedy, M. (1980). Speech perception. Language and Speech, 23, 45–66.
- Studdert-Kennedy, M., & Lane, H. (1980). Clues from the differences between signed and spoken language. In U. Bellugi & M. Studdert-Kennedy (Eds.), Signed and spoken language: Biological constraints on linguistic form (pp. 29–39). Deerfield Park, FL.
- Studdert-Kennedy, M., & Shankweiler, D. (1981). Hemispheric specialization for language processes. Science, 211, 960–961.
- Studdert-Kennedy, M. (1993). Discovering phonetic function. Journal of Phonetics, 21, 147–155.
- Studdert-Kennedy, M. & Goodell, E.W. (1995). Gestures, features and segments in early child speech. In: deGelder, B. & Morais, J. (eds.). Speech and Reading: A Comparative Approach. Hove, England: Erlbaum (UK), Taylor & Francis.
- Studdert-Kennedy, M. (1998). The particulate origins of language generativity: from syllable to gesture. In: Hurford, J., Studdert-Kennedy, M., & Knight, C. (eds.), Approaches to the evolution of language, Cambridge, U.K.: Cambridge University Press.
- Studdert-Kennedy, M. & Whalen, D.H. (1999). A brief history of speech perception research in the United States. In A. Bronstein, J.Ohala & W.Weigel (eds) A guide to the history of the phonetic sciences in the United States. University of California Press: Berkeley CA.
- Studdert-Kennedy, M., Mody, M. & Brady, S. (2000). Speech perception deficits in poor readers: A reply to Denenbergfs critique. Journal of Learning Disabilities, v.33, 4, 317–321.
- Studdert-Kennedy, M. (2000). Imitation and the emergence of segments. Phonetica, 57, 275–283.
- Studdert-Kennedy, M. (2000). Evolutionary implications of the particulate principle: imitation and the dissociation of phonetic form from semantic function. In: Knight, C., Studdert-Kennedy, M. & Hurford, J.R. (eds.). The Evolutionary Emergence of Language. Cambridge: Cambridge University Press.
- Studdert-Kennedy, M. & Goldstein, L. (2003). Launching language: The gestural origin of discrete infinity. In Morten Christiansen and Simon Kirby (eds.).Language Evolution, Oxford: Oxford University Press, 235–254.
- Studdert-Kennedy, M. (2005). How did language go discrete? Language Origins: Perspectives on Language, Oxford: Oxford University Press, pp. 48–67.
